= Washington State Route 503 =

State highway in Washington, US

State Route 503

- SR 503 highlighted in red

Route information
- Auxiliary route of I-5
- Maintained by WSDOT
- Length: 54.11 mi (87.08 km)
- Existed: 1964–present

Major junctions
- South end: SR 500 in Orchards
- SR 502 in Battle Ground
- North end: I-5 in Woodland

Location
- Country: United States
- State: Washington
- Counties: Clark, Cowlitz

Highway system
- State highways in Washington; Interstate; US; State; Scenic; Pre-1964; 1964 renumbering; Former
← SR 502	→ SR 504

State Route 503 (SR 503) is a 54.11-mile-long (87.08 km) state highway serving Clark and Cowlitz counties in the U.S. state of Washington. The highway travels north from a short concurrency with SR 500 in Orchards through Battle Ground, the eastern terminus of SR 502, and communities in rural Clark County before crossing the Lewis River on the Yale Bridge. SR 503 intersects its spur route and turns west to parallel the Lewis River downstream to Woodland, where the highway ends at an interchange with Interstate 5 (I-5). The highway was part of the Lewis River Road, signed as State Road 15, from 1909 until 1919. The current route of SR 503 was split between Secondary State Highway 1S (SSH 1) from Woodland to Battle Ground and SSH 1U from Battle Ground to Orchards in 1937, combined to form SR 503 during the 1964 highway renumbering. A spur route, established in 1991, travels northeast into the Gifford Pinchot National Forest along Yale Lake, serving the community of Cougar.

== Route description ==
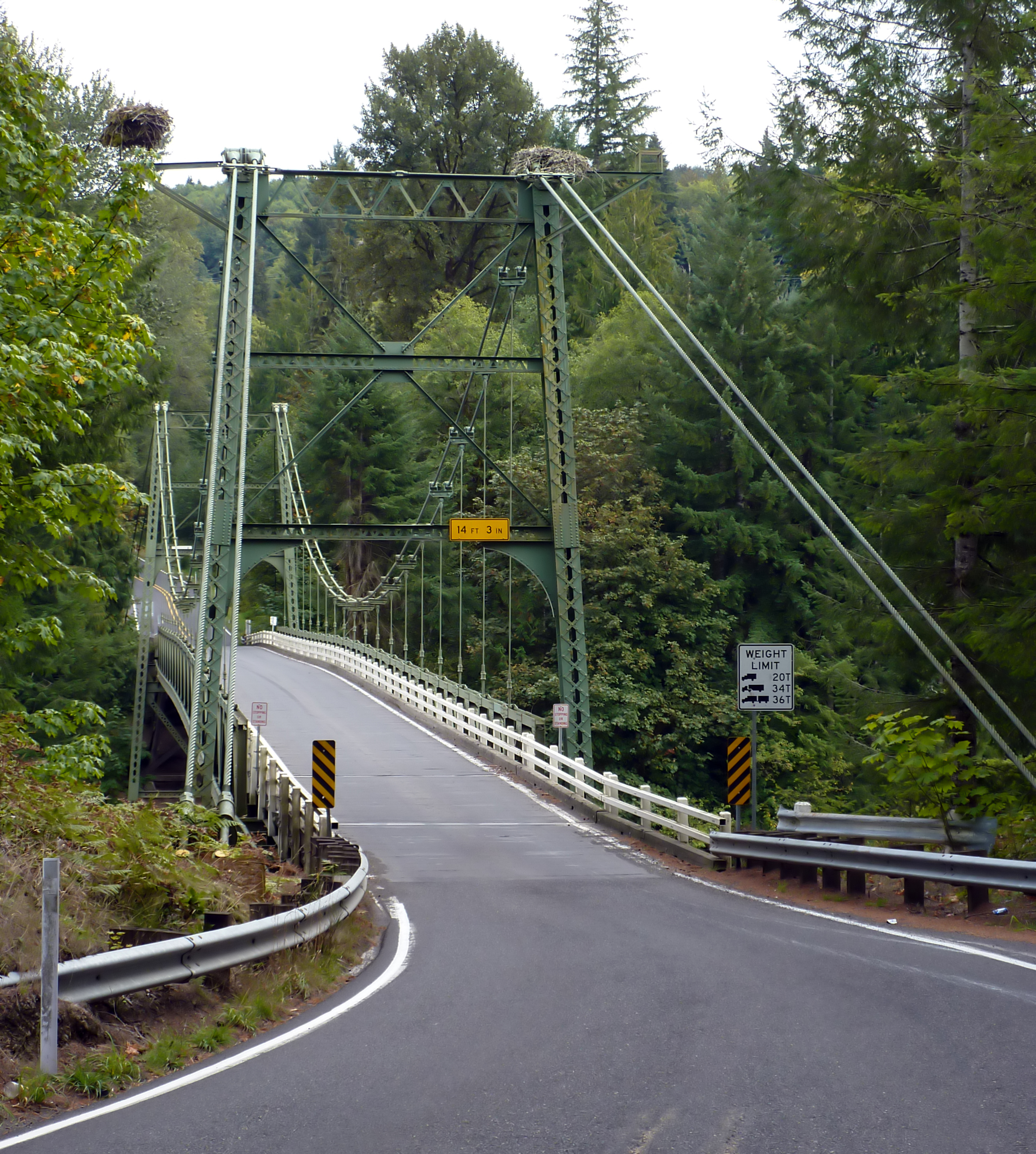
SR 503 crossing the Lewis River on the Yale Bridge between Clark and Cowlitz counties.

SR 503 begins concurrent to SR 500 at an intersection with Fourth Plain Boulevard in Orchards. The two highways travel north on the four-lane 117th Avenue through Orchards until SR 500 turns east onto Padden Parkway, while SR 503 continues north into rural Clark County, passing Prairie High School. The roadway bypasses Brush Prairie on its west side and crosses the Chelatchie Prairie Railroad, before it turns northeast onto 122nd Avenue. SR 503 enters Battle Ground as 10th Avenue and intersects the eastern terminus of SR 502 west of Battle Ground High School. The highway crosses the East Fork Lewis River and leaves Battle Ground to pass Lewisville Park, listed on the National Register of Historic Places and located in Lewisville. SR 503 continues heading northeast into a heavily forested region of the Cascades foothills, toward Fargher Lake and Amboy.

SR 503 turns east onto Fargher Lake Highway at Rock Creek and enters Amboy by following Chelatchie Creek towards Yale Lake. The highway travels north and crosses the Lewis River into Cowlitz County on the 532-foot-long (162 m) Yale Bridge. The one-lane warren truss bridge, listed on the National Register of Historic Places, is located downstream from the Yale Dam on Yale Lake and upstream of Lake Merwin. SR 503 continues into Cowlitz County and turns west onto Lewis River Road at an intersection with its spur route that heads east to Skamania County. The highway travels southwestward in the Lewis River valley and passes through the communities of Yale and Ariel. SR 503 enters Woodland and turns south onto Goerig Street before ending at a diamond interchange with I-5 near the confluence of the Lewis and Columbia rivers.

Every year, the Washington State Department of Transportation (WSDOT) conducts a series of surveys on its highways in the state to measure traffic volume. This is expressed in terms of annual average daily traffic (AADT), which is a measure of traffic volume for any average day of the year. In 2011, WSDOT calculated that the busiest section of the highway was the SR 500 concurrency in Orchards, serving 34,000 vehicles, while the least busiest section was at the western terminus of SR 503 Spur east of Yale, serving 720 vehicles. SR 503 between Orchards and Battle Ground is designated as part of the National Highway System, which includes roadways important to the national economy, defense, and mobility.

== History ==
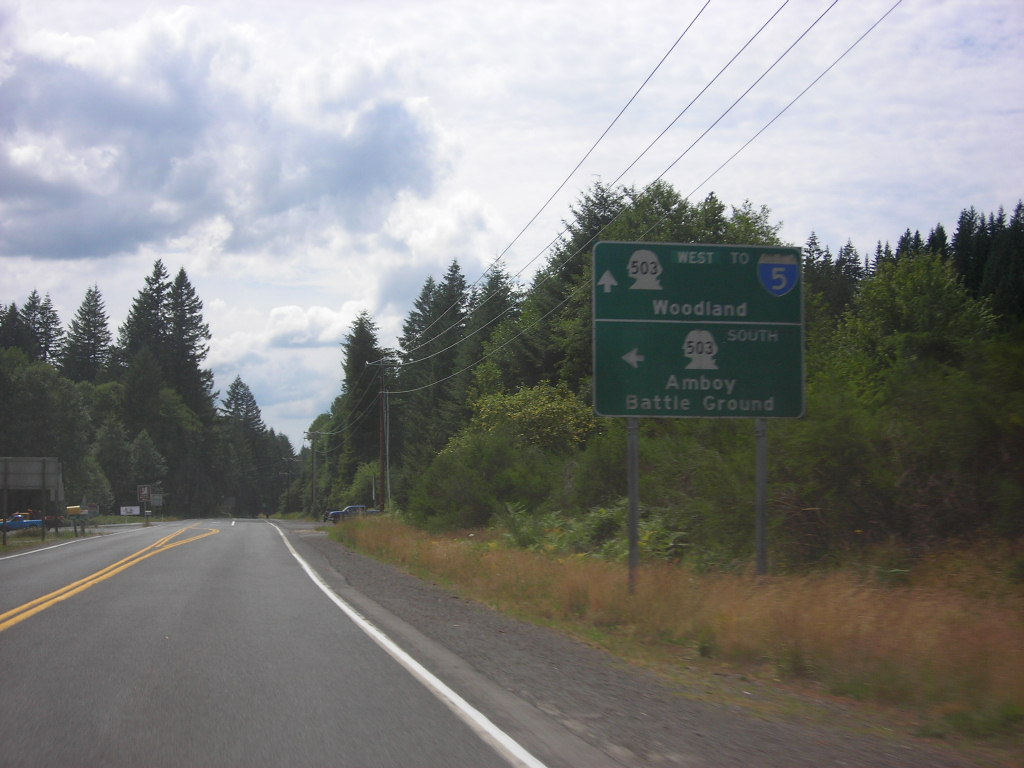
The spur route of SR 503, part of the original Lewis River Road in 1909, approaching its junction with the main highway near Yale

SR 503 follows the route of State Road 15, established in 1909 as the Lewis River Road, traveling east from Woodland to the Skamania county line in Columbia National Forest. The Lewis River Road was removed from the state highway system in 1919 and transferred to Cowlitz County for maintenance. Clark and Cowlitz counties contracted the Portland Bridge and Iron Company to build a bridge over the Lewis River in 1917 and the bridge was opened to traffic in September 1920 at a cost of $15,000. After the completion of the Merwin Dam downstream in 1931 caused water levels on the Lewis River to rise, the two counties completed a one-lane warren truss bridge named the Yale Bridge over the Lewis River the following year to serve the remote communities of Yale and Yacolt.

During the creation of the primary and secondary state highways in 1937, State Road 15 was added back to the state highway system as part of SSH 1S, which traveled 57.60 miles (92.70 km) from Primary State Highway 1 (PSH 1) and U.S. Route 99 (US 99) to SSH 1U in Battle Ground and turned west to end at PSH 1 and US 99 north of Mount Vista. PSH 1U, also established in 1937, traveled 8.56 miles (13.78 km) south from SSH 1S in Battle Ground to SSH 8A in Orchards. The Yale Bridge was maintained by Clark and Cowlitz counties until the 1940s and had its timber approach spans replaced with steel in 1958 under maintenance of the Department of Highways.

SR 503 was established during the 1964 highway renumbering and codified in 1970 as the successor to SSH 1U and part of SSH 1S between Battle Ground and Woodland, while the remaining portion of SSH 1S between Mount Vista and Battle Ground became SR 502. The highway in the Lewis River valley, between Woodland and the Yale Bridge, was closed following the May 18, 1980 eruption of Mount St. Helens and re-opened after the Yale Bridge was placed on the National Register of Historic Places in July 1982. The spur route of SR 503 was added to the state highway system in 1991 as part of the original Lewis River Road between Yale and the Skamania county line in the Gifford Pinchot National Forest. Between Orchards and Amboy, SR 503 was designated as the "Lewisville Highway", serving historic Lewisville Park. Until 1995 or 1996; SR 503 was on the one and only original and old alignment on NE Caples Rd, from NE 149th St to NE 179th St in Brush Prairie.

== Spur route ==
State Route 503 Spur
- Location: Yale–Skamania county line
- Length: 8.42 mi (13.55 km)
- Existed: 1991–present

SR 503 Spur, known locally as the Lewis River Road, begins its 8.42-mile-long (13.55 km) route at an intersection with SR 503 east of Yale and north of the Yale Bridge. The highway travels northeast along Yale Lake through a forested region of Cowlitz County, passing Yale Park and the community of Cougar. SR 503 Spur turns east at Beaver Bay Park and ends shortly thereafter at Forest Route 90 on the Skamania County line south of Mount St. Helens National Volcanic Monument and Gifford Pinchot National Forest. The Lewis River Road was part of State Road 15 from 1909 until 1919 and was re-established in 1991 as a spur route of SR 503. WSDOT conducted a series of surveys to measure traffic volume in terms of AADT and calculated that 650 to 1,300 vehicles per day used the spur route in 2011.

== Major intersections ==
County	Location	mi	km	Destinations	Notes
Clark	Orchards	0.00	0.00	SR 500 west – Vancouver	Southern terminus, south end of SR 500 overlap
Clark	Orchards	1.02	1.64	SR 500 east (Padden Parkway) – Camas	North end of SR 500 overlap
Clark	Battle Ground	7.87	12.67	SR 502 west (Main Street) to I-5 – City Center	Eastern terminus of SR 502
Lewis River		27.56– 27.65	44.35– 44.50	Yale Bridge	
Cowlitz		31.04	49.95	SR 503 Spur – Cougar, Mt. St. Helens	Southern terminus of SR 503 Spur
Cowlitz	Woodland	54.06– 54.11	87.00– 87.08	I-5 – Portland, Seattle	I-5 exit 21; northern terminus, interchange.
1.000 mi = 1.609 km; 1.000 km = 0.621 mi: Concurrency terminus
