= Tumtum Mountain =

Mountain in Washington, United States

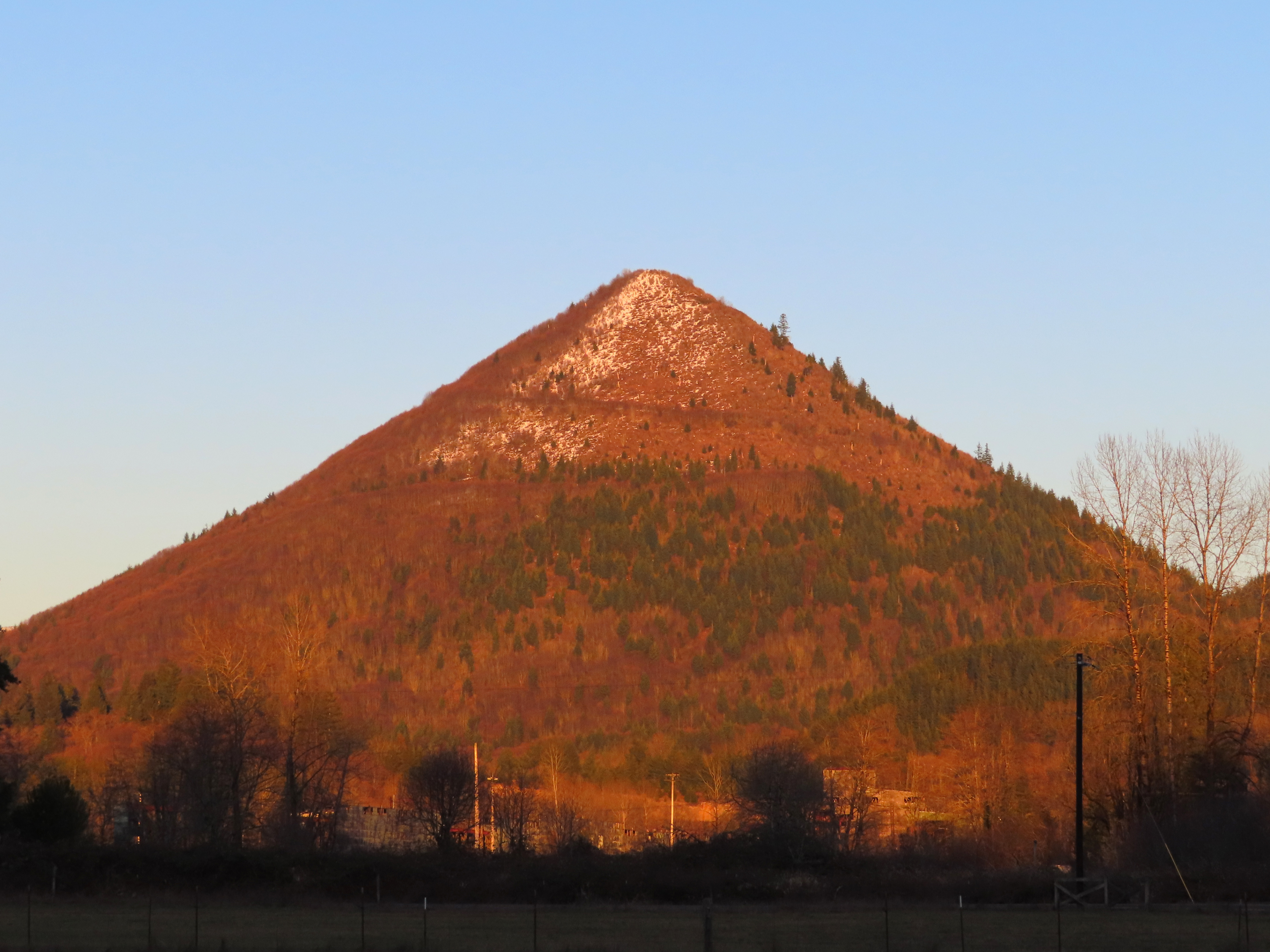
- Tumtum Mountain seen from the west along NE Healy Rd in Chelatchie Prairie just before sunset.

Highest point
- Elevation: 2,004 feet (611 m)
- Prominence: approx. 880 feet (270 m)
- Coordinates: 45°56′03″N 122°20′13″W

Naming
- Etymology: Chinook Jargon
- English translation: Heart

Geography
- Location within Washington (state)
- Location: Clark County, Washington, US
- Parent range: Cascade Range
- Topo map: USGS Yale Dam

Geology
- Rock age: Pleistocene
- Mountain type: Lava dome
- Rock type: Dacite
- Volcanic arc: Cascade Volcanic Arc
- Last eruption: 70,000 years ago

Climbing
- Easiest route: Abandoned logging road to summit

Tumtum Mountain is a small, highly-symmetrical volcanic cone in Washington, United States. Located in northern Clark County at the easternmost end of Chelatchie Prairie, it rises to an elevation of 2,004 feet (611 m), about 1,400 feet (430 m) above the flat prairie. This Pleistocene dacite lava dome is part of the Cascade Volcanic Arc, and with an age of only about 70,000 years, Tumtum Mountain is the youngest and westernmost volcano in the Cascades of Washington state.

== Geography and access ==
Tumtum Mountain is located among the foothills of the Cascade Range, about 2 miles (3.2 km) east of Washington State Route 503 via NE Healy Rd, whose junction is just north of the Mount St. Helens National Volcanic Monument headquarters in Chelatchie (officially Amboy, Washington). Healy Rd becomes Forest Road 54 as it enters Gifford Pinchot National Forest and traverses along the northern base of Tumtum Mountain, and a gated logging road ascending the north flank provides access to the mountain.

The active stratovolcano of Mount St. Helens is located only 19 miles (31 km) to the north-northeast, easily visible from the summit of Tumtum Mountain on clear days. The historic Yale Bridge, a one-lane metal suspension bridge built in 1932 over the steep canyon of the Lewis River at the eastern end of Lake Merwin, is located about 2.5 miles (4.0 km) to the northwest on SR 503. Yale Dam, a 323 feet (98 m) high hydroelectric dam built in 1953, is located about 2 miles (3 km) to the north of the mountain.

== Geology ==
Tumtum Mountain was apparently formed by lava rising to the surface along the northeasterly-striking Chelatchie Fault, which passes along the southern edge of Chelatchie Prairie and underneath the mountain. The surrounding rocks in the area are mostly much older basaltic lava flows, pyroclastics, and sediments of late Eocene to Miocene age (i.e. 5–40 million years old), heavily eroded and weathered. Much later, in the Pleistocene (within the last 10,000 to 2 million years), a large glacier filled the Lewis River valley, with an ice thickness reaching an elevation of 2,000–2,500 feet (610–760 m) in the vicinity of Tumtum Mountain, higher than the present summit. Glacial drift deposited by this glacier covers almost all of the region, but none is found on Tumtum Mountain itself, and the mountain shows no evidence of glacial erosion, so it must be younger than this last regional glaciation. Geologists estimate its age at around 70,000 years.

The rock of Tumtum Mountain is a very fine-grained light buff to gray dacite, with silica content of 68%, fairly typical and similar to that found in the lava domes of Mount St. Helens. The volcanic cone of Tumtum Mountain consists of talus and fragments of this dacite surrounding the lava dome itself. In addition, a small dacite lava flow is found on the north side at the base of the mountain, overlying the regional glacial drift.

== History ==
The land on Tumtum Mountain has been owned by a succession of logging companies over the past several decades, including Crown Zellerbach, Cavenham Forest Industries, and then private logging company owner Billie McKee Sr. since 1988. At some point the entire mountain was logged by one of these owners. An estate sale in 2011 placed a 360-acre (150 hectare) parcel containing the majority of the mountain on the market for $1.4 million, later reduced to $699,900.

== See also ==
- Breast-shaped hill
- Cascade Volcanoes
- Dishpan Gap
