= Etna (sternwheeler) =

- Etna on the Lewis River, pushing a barge, sometime between 1906 and 1911.

History
- Name: Etna
- Owner: Etna Transportation Co.
- Operator: Lurlie Gray
- Route: Lewis River
- In service: 1906
- Out of service: 1919
- Identification: U.S. #203622
- Fate: Sunk by drifting logs

General characteristics
- Tonnage: 41 gross register tons
- Length: 60 ft (18.29 m)
- Beam: 11.4 ft (3.47 m)
- Depth: 3.6 ft (1.10 m) depth of hold
- Installed power: 30 hp gasoline engine (1906-1907); replaced by twin steam engines, horizontally mounted, cylinder bore 5.0 in (127.0 mm) and stroke of 2.67 ft (0.81 m).
- Propulsion: stern-wheel
- Capacity: 10 tons deadweight of freight

Etna was a steamboat that operated on the Lewis and Lake rivers of southwestern Washington from 1906 to 1919. As built in 1906 Etna was originally powered by a gasoline engine, but in 1907 it was converted to steam-powered vessel.

Etna was named after Etna, Washington, a settlement on the south side of the Lewis River, in Clark County. Etna's principal activity was supporting the logging camps and lumber mills in the Lewis river area.

Etna was a light draft vessel which was essential for operating in the shallow water of the upper Lewis River. Even then, operation of Etna was substantially affected by the rise and fall of river levels, which were generally seasonal.

Small craft like Etna on the Columbia River system were sometimes referred to at the time as the "mosquito fleet"

== Construction ==
Etna was built in Portland, Oregon in 1906 for Horace Campbell by the Portland shipyard of Joseph Supple. Campbell was a steamboat engineer with extensive experience on the Lewis and Lake rivers.

== Dimensions ==
Etna was 60 ft (18.29 m) exclusive of the extension of the deck over the stern, called the fantail, on which the stern-wheel was mounted.

Etna had a beam of 11.4 ft (3.47 m) exclusive of the protective timbers along the upper sides of the hull called guards. The vessel had a depth of hold of 3.6 ft (1.10 m).

The overall size of the vessel was 41 gross tons (a measure of volume and not weight) and 40 registered tons.

Etna could carry about 10 tons deadweight of freight. The official merchant vessel registry number was 203622.

== Machinery ==
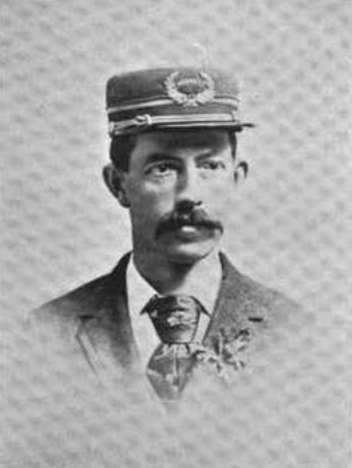
Horace Campbell, steamboat engineer and first owner of Etna, image from 1895 or earlier.

The original power for Etna was a 30 horsepower gasoline engine.

In August 1907, Horace Campbell had Etna converted from a gasoline engine to a steam-powered vessel. The steam power plant consisted of twin high-pressure single cylinder engines, horizontally mounted, each with a cylinder bore 5.0 in (127.0 mm) and stroke of 2.67 ft (0.81 m).

In December 1912, Etna Transportation Company, owners of Etna, bought an electric generator to install on the steamer. Electric lights were made necessary because of the increased level of traffic on the river required the steamer to operate during darkness, particularly in the winter when the days were shorter.

== Career ==
Horace Campbell planned to use Etna on the Lewis River route in conjunction with the sternwheeler Mascot. Logging camps and mills up the Lewis river depended on shallow-draft steamers like Etna to bring in supplies. Etna also carried passengers.

=== Proposed transfer to Willamette River ===
In June 1910, when low water barred navigation on the Willamette River above Newberg, Oregon, and government dredging operations had ceased, there was talk among the farmers along the river between Newberg and Wheatland of securing the steamer Etna, then running on the Lewis River, to carry freight on the Willamette.

=== Low water 1910 ===
On October 6, 1910, early rains raised the water level high enough on the north fork of the Lewis River so that Etna could navigate on the route. This was about three or four weeks before the water was usually deep enough for Etna to make the trip on the north fork

=== Grounding in 1911 ===
In mid-February 1911, Etna struck a boulder and had to be taken to Joseph Supple's shipyard in Portland to be repaired. The repairs were complete by February 26, but the steamer still could not ascend the Lewis River because of low water, there having been no recent rain or warmer weather to melt the mountain snows.

=== Dam construction material ===
In March 1911 it was "practically decided" that Etna, running under Captain Lurlie Gray, would be used to transport material and supplies to be used in construction of a power dam about 30 miles upriver from Woodland, Washington. The river then stood at 3.8 feet and it was expected that Etna would have no difficulty reaching Ariel, Washington, the head of navigation.

=== Low water 1911 ===
On Wednesday, November 8, 1911, rainfall in the Lewis River area raised the water level sufficiently to allow Etna to make its first trip of the fall season.

== Increased lumber business 1912 ==
In May 1912 the logging and lumber mill business on the Lewis River was more prosperous than it had been for a long time. About a year previously, Dubois Lumber Co. of Vancouver, Washington had purchased over 40,000,000 board feet of timber about 15 miles upriver from Woodland.

After much preparation, including road work, the company was reported to be ready to begin operations on Monday, May 13, 1912, with 25 to 40 men employed. About 25 men arrived at Woodland on Thursday May 9, and Etna took them to the logging camp on the North Fork at Yale, 25 miles upriver from Woodland.

=== New schedule ===
On Tuesday May 14, 1912, Etna went on a new schedule, running round trips on Mondays, Tuesdays, Thursdays, and Saturdays between Woodland and Ariel. Previously Etna had been traveling upriver one day and returning downriver the next day. The new schedule would remain in effect until the next low water season.

=== Transport of rails ===
In November 1912 the Harvey Mill Company was building a logging railroad. The first car for the railroad was brought in on November 6, 1912, by the steamer Etna. A large shipment of rails was expected, sufficient to construct the anticipated seven miles of trackage that the company planned to build.

November 6 was also the first day that the water level in the river had risen sufficiently to allow Etna to resume operations. The first five cars of rails arrived at Woodland on November 20, 1912, and were placed on the river bank to be carried upriver by the steamer Etna. There were expected to be a total of 15 cars worth of rails shipped in, in installments of five cars each.

=== Sawmill transport ===
On December 5, 1912, a complete sawmill capable of cutting 50,000 board feet per day arrived at Woodland, intend for the North Fork Logging Company then operating at Yale, 25 miles upriver from Woodland. Etna would take the new mill up to the logging camp at Yale, where the mill would be used mainly for cutting railway ties.

== Later career ==
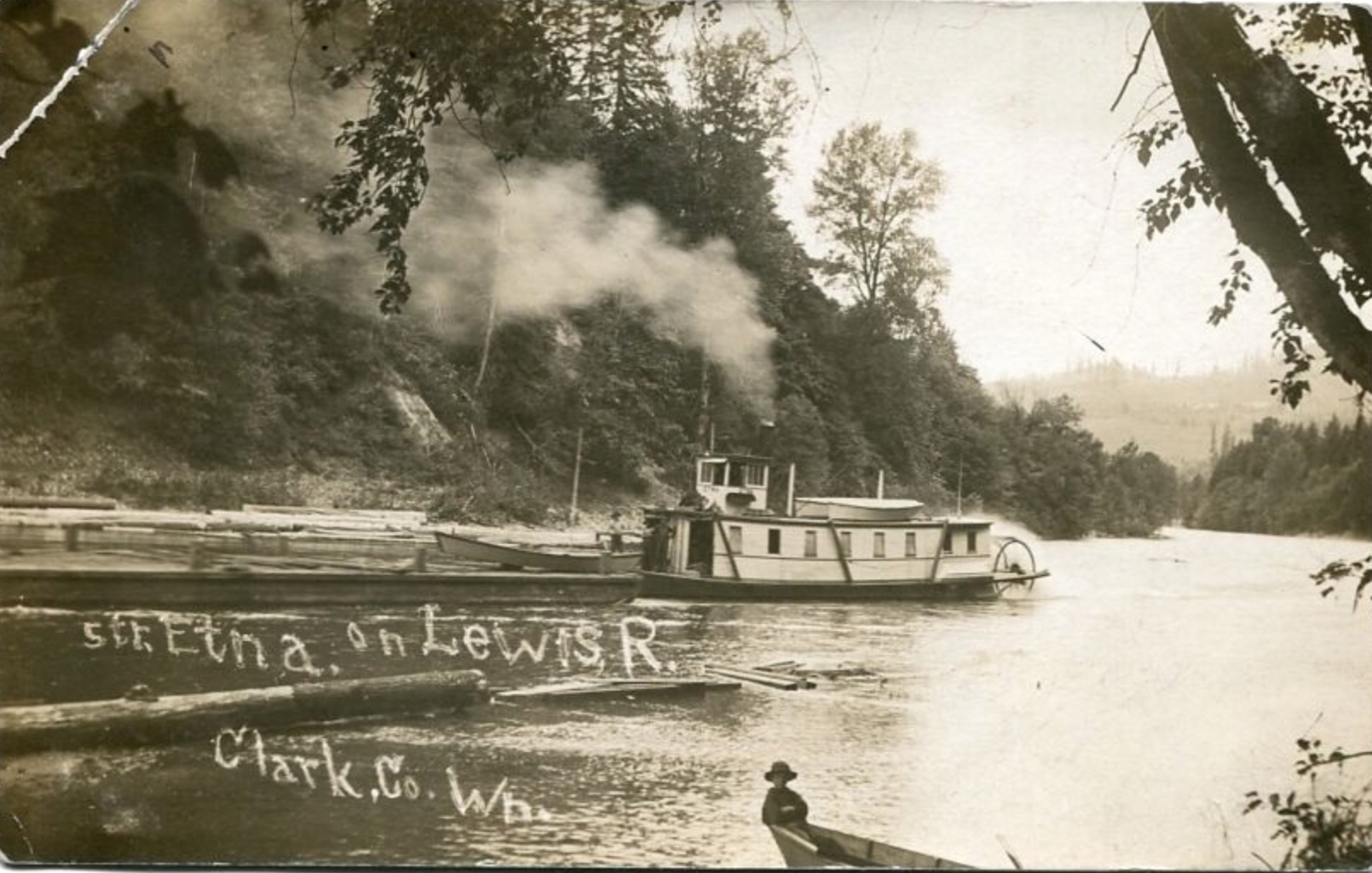
Etna pushing a barge on the Lewis River, 1911 or earlier.

Following the summer low water season of 1914, Captain Gray of Etna expected to begin operations on the Lewis River in about the middle of September, which was the earliest possible time under normal river conditions.

=== Dynamiting snags ===
In mid-December 1914, the sternwheeler Woodland, running on the north fork of the Lewis River under Capt. John W. Exon, was delayed by a day in returning to Woodland by some snags in the river at a place called Lamb's Bar. These snags had been recently exposed because of a change in the channel caused by a recent rise in the river.

Captain Exon informed the United States Engineers office in Portland, and they authorized Exon to have the snags removed. Captain Lurlie Gray and the steamer Etna, as well as a crew of men, were engaged to dynamite the snags.

=== Logging camps resume operation ===
In January 1916, it was reported that many of the logging camps and mills on the north fork of the Lewis River which had suspended operations, some of them for several years, would resume work as soon as weather conditions improved. The decline of logging work had forced Capt. Lurlie J. Gray, of the Etna, to tie up the boat. With logging activity expected to resume soon, Captain Gray was getting ready to return Etna into service.

In late May 1916, Capt. Gray and Etna delivered a fifth car of rails for the Dubois logging camp at Ariel. Late rains and snowmelt had kept the river unusually high for that time of year.

=== Rescue and medical transport ===
On August 27, 1916, Capt. Lurlie Gray rescued and resuscitated a boy, Elmer Scott, aged 12, from drowning after the boy had been drawn under a launch at Woodland by the current in the Lewis River. The boy had been swimming with some friends.

On February 11, 1918, George Waldron, an employee of the Tenny Logging company near Ren, on the Lewis river was seriously hurt by a flying log. Waldron was taken downriver to Woodland on Etna, where he was treated by Dr. Hoffman, after which Waldron was taken to a hospital in Portland.

== Disposition ==
Etna was not worked after 1919. According to a contemporaneous source, on November 18, 1918, a rise in the water level of the Lewis River at Woodland resulted in the sinking of Etna. The steamer was anchored behind a jetty. The water overtopped the jetty, carrying sawlogs with it. These sawlogs caught on the anchor cable, pulling the steamer down.
