= Yale Bridge =

- U.S. National Register of Historic Places
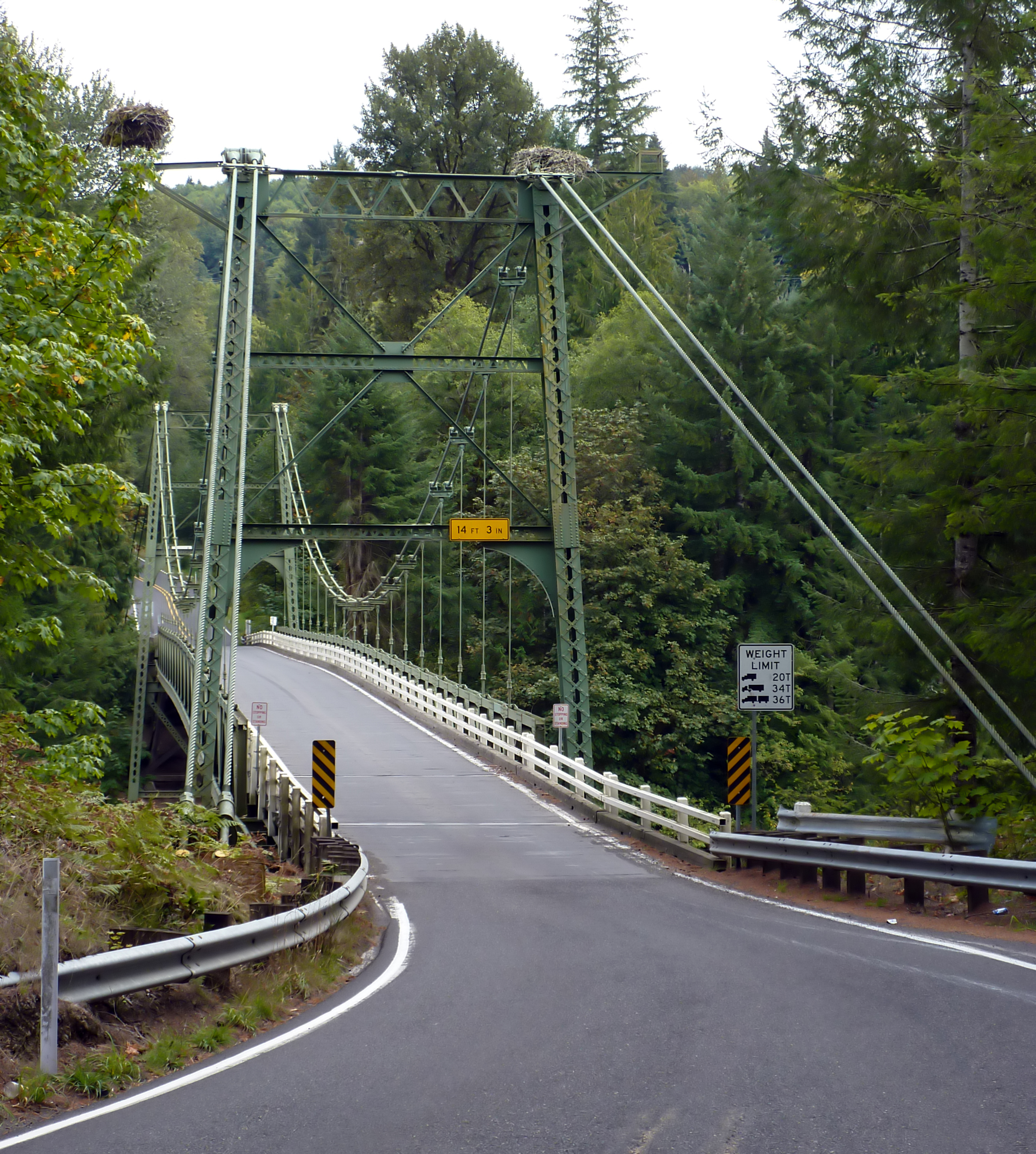
- Yale Bridge - Note osprey nests on tower

- Location within Washington (state)
- Location: Spans Lewis River on SR 503, Yale, Washington
- Coordinates: 45°57′39″N 122°22′23″W
- Area: Less than one acre
- Built: 1932
- Architect: Harold H. Gilbert; Gilpin Construction Co.
- Architectural style: Short-span steel suspension bridge
- MPS: Historic Bridges/Tunnels in Washington State TR
- NRHP reference No.: 82004206
- Added to NRHP: July 16, 1982

The Yale Bridge or Lewis River Bridge spans the Lewis River near Yale, Washington. It was built in 1932 by Cowlitz and Clark counties. The suspension bridge has a clear span of 300 feet (91 m), with a total length of 532 feet (162 m), replacing a previous steel truss bridge at the site. Construction of the Ariel Dam had created Lake Merwin with a water depth of 90 feet (27 m) at the site, requiring a new bridge that did not need to have support piers in the water. The road deck, stiffened by a steel Warren truss, is 50 feet (15 m) above the high water line of the reservoir.

== History ==
The bridge was designed by Harold H. Gilbert of the Washington State Highway Department, and was constructed by the Gilpin Construction Company of Portland, Oregon.

== Structure ==
The only short-span steel suspension bridge in Washington, the bridge incorporates unique features. Only the central span is slung from the cables, with separate unloaded cables acting as backstays running from the 88.75-foot (27.05 m) tall towers to concrete anchorages in the canyon's rocky sides. The approach spans were originally supported from below by a timber structure. The cables are discontinuous at the towers, unlike most suspension bridges, in which the cables run over a saddle on the towers. With less wear, the cables could be smaller. The bridge deck is made of timbers with an asphalt overlay. The counties transferred the bridge to the Washington State Department of Highways in the late 1930s and it was refitted in 1957–58 with steel approach spans. It is noted for prominent brackets supporting osprey nests.

== Recognition ==
The bridge was placed on the National Register of Historic Places on July 16, 1982.

== See also ==
- List of bridges documented by the Historic American Engineering Record in Washington (state)
- List of bridges on the National Register of Historic Places in Washington (state)
