= Washington State Route 131 =

State highway in Lewis County, Washington, US

State Route 131
- Woods Creek Road; Cispus Road
- SR 131 highlighted in red.

Route information
- Auxiliary route of US 12
- Maintained by WSDOT
- Length: 2.07 mi (3.33 km)
- Existed: 1991 (current route)–present

Major junctions
- South end: FR 25 at Gifford Pinchot National Forest boundary near Randle
- North end: US 12 in Randle

Location
- Country: United States
- State: Washington
- Counties: Lewis

Highway system
- State highways in Washington; Interstate; US; State; Scenic; Pre-1964; 1964 renumbering; Former
← SR 129	→ SR 141

State Route 131 (SR 131, commonly called Woods Creek Road and Cispus Road) is a short 2.07-mile (3.33 km) Washington state highway in Lewis County, extending from the northern terminus of Forest Route 25 (FR 25) at the boundary of the Gifford Pinchot National Forest to U.S. Route 12 (US 12) in Randle. The current route first appeared on a map in 1924 and became SR 131 in 1991, but an earlier SR 131 existed in the Ellensburg area from 1964 until 1975, when it was replaced by US 97.

== Route description ==
State Route 131 (SR 131) begins at the northern end of Forest Route 25 (FR 25) located at the Gifford Pinchot National Forest boundary, which continues south (via FR 90), east of Mount St. Helens and Spirit Lake, to SR 503 Spur in Cougar. From FR 25, the roadway travels northbound as Woods Creek Road to an intersection with Cispus Road, where it is renamed to the aforementioned street. The highway then crosses the Cowlitz River and ends at U.S. Route 12 (US 12) in Randle. Before the US 12 intersection in Randle, the road was used by a daily average of 1,700 motorists in 2007, making this segment the busiest along the route. The same intersection was also the busiest on SR 131 in 1992, only with a daily average of 3,100 motorists.

== History ==
The first appearance of the current route on a map was in 1924, when a map of the area around Mount Rainier showed a road extending from Siler Creek to Randle. The roadway ran north from the creek to a branch of State Road 5, later PSH 5. The highway then became SR 131 in 1991, when the Washington State Legislature revised the highway system.

== Major intersections ==
The entire highway is in Lewis County.

Location	mi	km	Destinations	Notes
	0.00	0.00	FR 25 (Woods Creek Road) to SR 503 Spur – Cougar, Yale	Southern terminus
Randle	2.07	3.33	US 12 – Centralia, Naches, Yakima	Northern terminus
1.000 mi = 1.609 km; 1.000 km = 0.621 mi
