= Clark Public Utilities =

Public utility district in Clark County, Washington, U.S.

- Type: Public utility
- Industry: Electric power distribution, Water industry
- Founded: 1938, 88 years ago (as Public Utility District No. 1 of Clark County)
- Headquarters: Vancouver, Washington
- Key people: Lena Wittler, General Manager
- Products: Electricity and water
- Number of employees: 400
- Website: clarkpublicutilities.com

Public Utility District No. 1 of Clark County, doing business as Clark Public Utilities and commonly referred to as Clark PUD, is a public utility district in Clark County, Washington. Clark PUD provides electric service to all of Clark County except for the Georgia-Pacific Camas Paper Mill in the City of Camas, and its water service area covers the majority of the county, except the Cities of Battle Ground, Camas, Ridgefield, Washougal, and Vancouver, which have their own municipal water systems.

== Organization ==
After previous attempts in 1934 and again in 1936 failed, Clark PUD was formed by referendum in 1938, when the citizens of Clark County approved a proposal to create a municipal nonprofit organization to provide electric service to the County under the laws of the State of Washington. At the time, Clark County's electric service was being provided by two private utility companies, Portland General Electric (PGE) served the Vancouver area, and the Northwest Electric Company (NEC) served the remainder of rural Clark County. Both companies had waged vigorous campaigns to defeat the measure, and did not readily withdraw from the County even after the measure was approved.

As a public entity, Clark PUD was to be led by a three-member county commission charged with overseeing the utility. Clark PUD's first commissioners were elected simultaneously to the creation of the district, they were Heye H. Meyer, L. M. Jones, and Adolf Ast.

Clark PUD is overseen by the Board of Commissioners, who hire and supervise a General Manager, set policy, approve budgets, establish rates, and approve major expenses. The General Manager oversees day-to-day operations of the District.

=== Current members of the Board of Commissioners ===
- Nancy Barnes
- Sherry Erickson
- Jane Van Dyke

== History timeline ==
- 1938: Public Utility District No. 1 of Clark County was formed following a vote of the citizens of Clark County.
- 1939: Clark PUD entered into negotiations with the Bonneville Power Administration (BPA) to secure access to electric power supplies.
- 1940: Clark PUD submitted offers to buy out the Clark County assets of PGE and NEC, but both companies refused the offers.
- 1941: Citizens from the Lincoln Avenue, Minnehaha, and Bryn Lawn neighborhoods asked Clark PUD to provide water service to an area north of the City of Vancouver's water system. A public hearing was scheduled to consider the request, but the process was interrupted by the United States entering World War II.
- 1942: Amidst the war effort, one of the seven Kaiser Shipyards was built on the north shore of the Columbia River at Ryan Point in Vancouver, to participate in the war effort by producing Liberty ships and Victory ships, and with it came plans to build several war housing projects. The City of Vancouver created a housing authority to operate the projects, and Clark PUD successfully outbid PGE and NEC to serve what would later become the MacLoughlin Heights neighborhood of Vancouver. At 12:00 noon on August 21, the Air Reduction Company (today part of Linde), which was built in Vancouver to serve as an acetylene producer for the new shipyard, became Clark PUD's first customer, receiving electricity purchased and delivered by the new public utility company. Three days later, Clark PUD began service to the new housing projects. The Vancouver Linde plant is still in operation at its original site, at 4715 NE 78th St (Google Street View).
- 1944: After unproductive negotiations with PGE and NEC, Clark PUD adopted a resolution to acquire the electric transmission and distribution assets in Clark County from both companies through court action.
- 1945: The Washington Court of Appeals in Tacoma set a purchase price of $801,000 on PGE's assets in Clark County, and Clark PUD floated revenue bonds to finance the purchase. Clark PUD was approached again from residents asking the District to provide water service, this time in the Hazel Dell area north of Vancouver.
- 1948: The Superior Court of Clark County set a purchase price of $4,837,500 on NEC's assets in Clark County, and Clark PUD subsequently obtained the remainder of privately held electric delivery assets in the County except for the Crown Columbia paper mill in Camas (which was served by NEC via subtransmission lines from Troutdale, Oregon, across the Columbia River). Through obtaining these assets, Clark PUD also began serving a small number of customers in southeast Cowlitz County north of Lake Merwin and west of Yale Lake, and a small handful of customers in southwestern Skamania County east of Washougal. The Camas Mill remains a customer of NEC's successor, PacifiCorp, to the present day, and it is still not electrically connected to Clark PUD.
- 1951: Clark PUD formally commenced water service with delivery to its first 357 customers in the Hazel Dell neighborhood.
- 1989: The citizens of the City of La Center voted to establish a municipal wastewater system, to be managed by Clark PUD.
- 1997: Clark PUD began operation of its own electric generation facility, the 230MW natural gas combined-cycle River Road Generating Plant, located in southwest Vancouver at 5201 NW Old Lower River Rd, to supplement the purchase of energy supplies from BPA.
- 2006: Ownership of the wastewater treatment plant in La Center was transferred back to the City of La Center, and Clark PUD ceased wastewater management operations.
- 2007: Public Utility District No. 1 of Cowlitz County (Cowlitz PUD) purchased Clark PUD's assets that were located within Cowlitz County, in anticipation of extending their own distribution system to serve the approximately 50 Cowlitz County customers served by Clark PUD. Cowlitz PUD's extension construction was completed in early 2010, and they successfully established service to that territory on February 17 of that year, ending Clark PUD electric service to Cowlitz County. Clark PUD still serves two customers in Skamania County who have not yet been reached by Public Utility District No. 1 of Skamania County (Skamania PUD).

== Operations ==
Clark PUD's electric service area is approximately 657 square miles and covers all of Clark County, except for approximately 500 acres in Camas occupied by the Georgia-Pacific Camas Paper Mill. The electric system consists of 55 substations and switching stations, one generating plant, and approximately 6,600 miles of transmission and distribution power lines. Other electric infrastructure assets not owned by Clark PUD remain in Clark County but do not serve any local customers; BPA, headquartered in Clark County, owns and operates three major substations and several transmission lines in the county, and PacifiCorp (successor of NEC) owns and operates two hydroelectric dams along Clark County's northern boundary along with their associated transmission lines.

Clark PUD's established water service area is approximately 220 square miles, but the District's responsibility to operate new water systems covers almost all of unincorporated central and northern Clark County except for areas served by the Cities of Battle Ground and Ridgefield. The primary water system and all of the satellite systems combined include 35 wells, 51 booster pump stations, and approximately 788 miles of water mains and distribution lines.

The District employs approximately 380 personnel, and serves approximately 194,000 customers. The Vancouver Service Center located at 1200 Fort Vancouver Way (45.630149°N 122.6632612°W) serves as the District's primary administration and business office, and the Orchards Service Center located at 8600 NE 117th Avenue (45.6844789°N 122.5539012°W) serves as the District's primary operations center.

Approximately 30% of Clark PUD's electricity needs are met through operation of the River Road Generating Plant, with the majority of the remainder met through purchases from BPA. Clark PUD also has a share of the wind power generated from the Combine Hills II Wind Farm in Milton-Freewater, Oregon, as well as a share of the generation from the Packwood Lake Hydroelectricity Project near Packwood, Washington.

Clark PUD maintains transmission interties with BPA and PacifiCorp, and distribution interties for emergency distribution service with Cowlitz PUD and Skamania PUD.

A small group of seven NERC certified System Operators are monitoring and operating the transmission and distribution system twenty four hours a day, seven days a week. When the System Operators are unable to reroute the power from different circuits they dispatch field laborers to the scene where they make repairs and get the system back in working order.
