= Washington State Route 502 =

State highway in Clark County, Washington, US

State Route 502
- Battle Ground Highway
- A map with SR 502 highlighted in red

Route information
- Auxiliary route of I-5
- Maintained by WSDOT
- Length: 6.12 mi (9.85 km)
- Existed: 1964–present

Major junctions
- West end: I-5 near Mount Vista
- East end: SR 503 in Battle Ground

Location
- Country: United States
- State: Washington
- Counties: Clark

Highway system
- State highways in Washington; Interstate; US; State; Scenic; Pre-1964; 1964 renumbering; Former
← SR 501	→ SR 503

State Route 502 (SR 502, officially known as the Battle Ground Highway) is a 6.12-mile-long (9.85 km) state highway in the U.S. state of Washington, serving the city of Battle Ground in Clark County. The highway travels due east from an interchange with Interstate 5 (I-5) north of Mount Vista through Dollars Corner and Battle Ground to an intersection with SR 503, serving as connector between Battle Ground and I-5. Prior to the 1964 highway renumbering, SR 502 was part of Secondary State Highway 1S (SSH 1S), which was established in 1937. The highway traveled south from its current western terminus until the construction of a new interchange with I-5 in 2008, part of a project to widen SR 502 and install a median barrier on the roadway.

== Route description ==
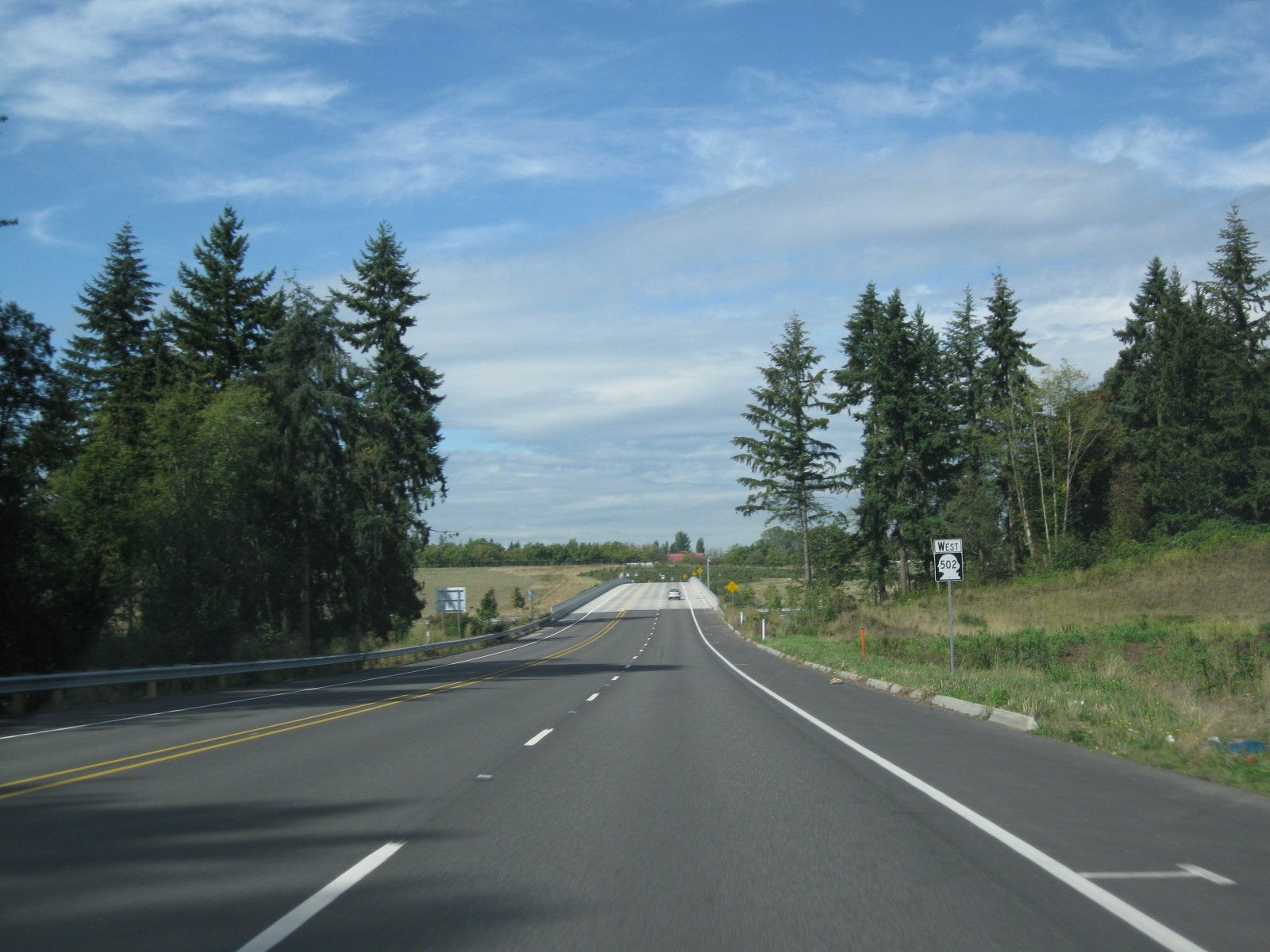
SR 502 westbound approaching its western terminus, an interchange with I-5.

SR 502 begins as the four-lane Battle Ground Highway at exit 11 on I-5, a trumpet interchange located north of Mount Vista, and travels due east as 219th Street, crossing Gee Creek and passing the northbound Gee Creek rest area. The four-lane highway travels east through rural Clark County and the community of Dollars Corner before it enters the city of Battle Ground, where it becomes Main Street. SR 502 crosses over Mill Creek and travels through the city, ending at an intersection with SR 503 and Main Street.

Every year, the Washington State Department of Transportation (WSDOT) conducts a series of surveys on its highways in the state to measure traffic volume. This is expressed in terms of annual average daily traffic (AADT), which is a measure of traffic volume for any average day of the year. In 2011, WSDOT calculated that between 8,200 and 26,000 vehicles per day used the highway, mostly within Battle Ground. The entire route is designated as part of the National Highway System, which includes roadways important to the national economy, defense, and mobility.

== History ==
SSH 1S was created in 1937 during the formation of the primary and secondary state highways, traveling on a 57.60-mile-long (92.70 km) route east from Primary State Highway 1 (PSH 1) and U.S. Route 99 (US 99) north of Mount Vista to intersect SSH 1U in Battle Ground and turned north towards Amboy and west to end at PSH 1 and US 99 in Woodland. After PSH 1 and US 99 was realigned onto a four-lane limited-access highway in the late 1940s, SSH 1S was extended south over the old highway to intersect PSH 1 and US 99.

SR 502 was established during the 1964 highway renumbering and codified in 1970 as the successor to the Mount Vista–Battle Ground section of SSH 1S, while US 99 was replaced by I-5. WSDOT constructed a new interchange between I-5 and 219th Street between April 2007 and October 2008 at a cost of $52 million. The new interchange and subsequent realignment shortened the total length of SR 502 by 1.46 miles (2.35 km), however, the mileposts were not updated, as of 2011. During construction of the interchange, WSDOT uncovered archaeological remains belonging to a Coast Salish settlement at Gee Creek that were at least 8,000 years old. The entire highway was christened the "Battle Ground Highway" in May 2009 to signify the importance of SR 502 connecting the city of Battle Ground to I-5.

WSDOT began preparing to install a median barrier and widen SR 502 to four lanes between the I-5 interchange and the western Battle Ground city limit in July 2012 to accommodate increasing traffic on the highway, which has a speed limit up to 50 miles per hour (80 km/h). Construction for the $85 million project began in earnest in 2014. New Mill Creek wetlands were created, to mitigate for wetlands buried by construction, which included the driving of 1,200 concrete pilings. The new, four-lane highway, which includes 10-foot (3.0 m) shoulders for bicycle and pedestrian travel and traffic signals at major intersections, opened on June 27, 2016. An expansion of the I-5 interchange to provide a western connection to Ridgefield was proposed in 2021.

== Major intersections ==
The entire highway is in Clark County.

Location	mi	km	Destinations	Notes
	0.00– 0.34	0.00– 0.55	I-5 – Seattle, Portland	I-5 exit 11; western terminus, interchange
Battle Ground	6.12	9.85	SR 503 (NW/SW 10th Avenue) – Amboy, Yacolt, Orchards	Eastern terminus, continues as W Main Street
1.000 mi = 1.609 km; 1.000 km = 0.621 mi
