= Yale, Washington =

Unincorporated community in Washington, United States

- Unincorporated community
- Location in the state of Washington Yale (the United States)
- Coordinates: 45°59′43″N 122°22′48″W
- Country: United States
- State: Washington
- County: Cowlitz
- Elevation: 446 ft (136 m)
- Time zone: UTC−8 (PST)
  - Summer (DST): UTC−7 (PDT)
- ZIP Code: 98603
- Area code(s): 360, 564
- FIPS code: 53-80080
- GNIS feature ID: 1528345

Yale is an unincorporated community in Cowlitz County, Washington, northeast of the city of Woodland. Yale is located 22.4 miles (36.0 km) northeast of Woodland along Washington State Route 503 and situated between Yale Lake and Lake Merwin, both reservoirs on the Lewis River. The rock-fill hydro-electric Yale Dam is nearby. Named for Yale University, the only school teaching forestry in the 19th century, the Yale community is part of the Woodland School District, a K-12 school district of about 2,200 students.

Yale is second nearest community, after Cougar, to Mount St. Helens, which lies 16.2 miles (26.1 km) to its northeast. The eruption of Mount St. Helens on May 18, 1980 was the deadliest and most economically destructive volcanic event in the history of the United States. For many years climbers attempting to scale Mount St. Helens registered at Jack's Store until it burned down in December 2007. Yale has several view locations for Mount St. Helens.
