= Paradise Point State Park =

State park in Washington (state), United States

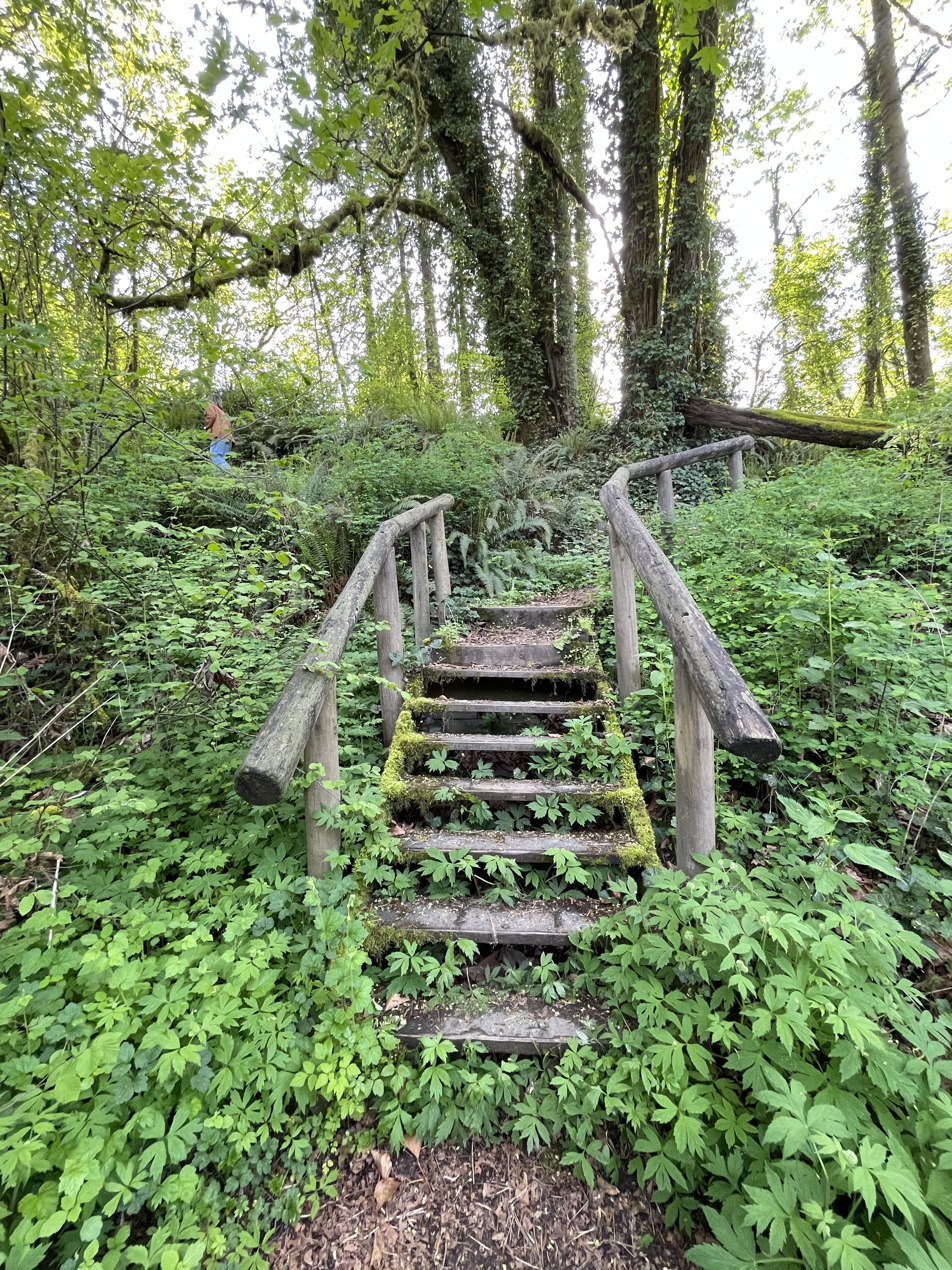
- Stairs at Paradise Point State Park, 2003

- Location within Washington (state) Location within the United States
- Location: Clark County, Washington, United States
- Coordinates: 45°52′17″N 122°42′32″W
- Area: 88 acres (36 ha)
- Elevation: 56 ft (17 m)
- Established: 1958
- Administrator: Washington State Parks and Recreation Commission
- Website: Official website

Paradise Point State Park is a public recreation area on the East Fork Lewis River in Clark County, Washington. The state park is crossed by Interstate 5, which pierces the point in the river the park is named for. The park's 88 acres (36 ha) include 6,180 feet (1,880 m) of shoreline, swimming beach, campground, and hiking trails.
