= Amboy, Washington =

- Census-designated place
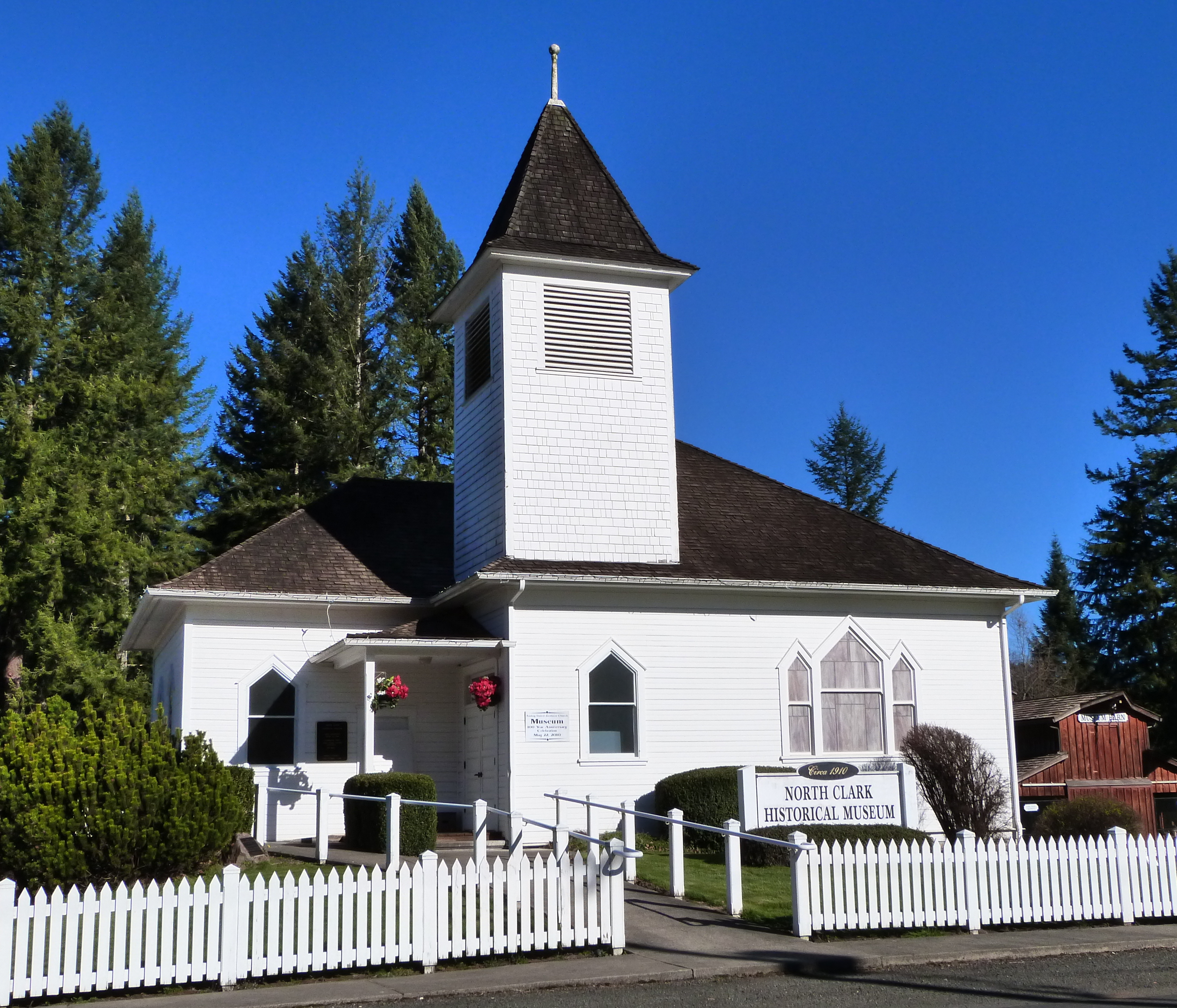
- North Clark Historical Museum

- Location of Amboy, Washington
- Coordinates: 45°54′48″N 122°29′47″W
- Country: United States
- State: Washington
- County: Clark

Area
  - Total: 10.00 sq mi (25.91 km^{2})
  - Land: 9.98 sq mi (25.86 km^{2})
  - Water: 0.015 sq mi (0.04 km^{2})
- Elevation: 761 ft (232 m)

Population (2020)
  - Total: 1,838
  - Density: 161/sq mi (62.2/km^{2})
- Time zone: UTC-8 (Pacific (PST))
  - Summer (DST): UTC-7 (PDT)
- ZIP Code: 98601
- Area code: 360, 564
- FIPS code: 53-01850
- GNIS feature ID: 2407738

Amboy (/ˈæmbɔɪ/) is a census-designated place (CDP) in Clark County, Washington, United States. The population was 1,838 at the 2020 census, up from 1,608 at the 2010 census. It is located 33 miles northeast of Vancouver which is part of the Portland-Vancouver metropolitan area.

== History ==
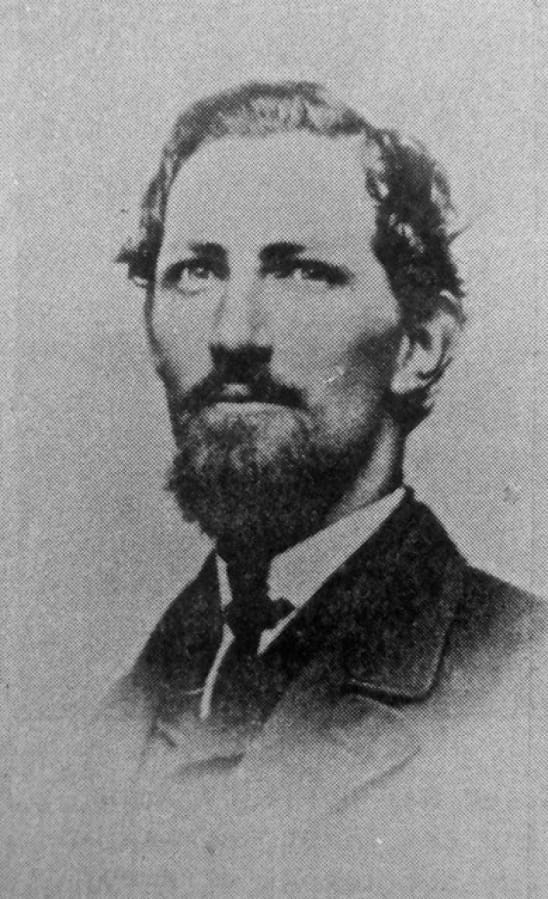
Amos M. Ball

Amboy was named by Amos M. Ball, who settled in the area in 1879 and whose family operated the Post Office after it was established in 1880. According to some sources, there were several settlers in the area, including Ball, with the initials A.M.B., who referred to themselves as the A.M. Boys. Reportedly, Ball named the town after that group. Another story states that the town was named after Ball's son, referred to by locals as the A.M. Boy.

A historical church known as the Amboy United Brethren Church was built in 1910 and converted into a museum in 2000.

In 2008, the Federal Bureau of Investigation sent agents to Amboy to inspect a parachute which may have belonged to the 1971 airplane hijacker known as D. B. Cooper. The parachute, which had been found by local children, was found to not match any of the four acquired by Cooper and was, in fact, a silk parachute likely manufactured in the 1940s.

== Geography ==
Amboy is located in northern Clark County at the junction of Chelatchie Creek and Cedar Creek, a west-flowing tributary of the Lewis River. Washington State Route 503 passes through the community, leading southwest 11 miles (18 km) to Lewisville and northeast 11 miles (18 km) to Yale. Amboy is located approximately 30 miles (48 km) northeast of Vancouver, Washington.

According to the United States Census Bureau, in 2010 the Amboy CDP had a total area of 10.0 square miles (25.9 km^{2}), of which 0.02 square miles (0.04 km^{2}), or 0.16%, is water. This was a reduction from a total area of 14.3 square miles (37.1 km^{2}) at the 2000 census.

== Demographics ==
Historical population
Census	Pop.	Note	%±
2000	2,085		—
2010	1,608		−22.9%
2020	1,800		11.9%
U.S. Decennial Census; 1990 2000 2010

Amboy first appeared as a census designated place in the 2000 U.S. census.

=== Racial and ethnic composition ===
Amboy CDP, Washington – Racial and ethnic composition Note: the US Census treats Hispanic/Latino as an ethnic category. This table excludes Latinos from the racial categories and assigns them to a separate category. Hispanics/Latinos may be of any race.
Race / Ethnicity (NH = Non-Hispanic)	Pop 2000	Pop 2010	Pop 2020	% 2000	% 2010	% 2020
White alone (NH)	1,976	1,519	1,564	94.77%	94.47%	86.89%
Black or African American alone (NH)	9	3	3	0.43%	0.19%	0.17%
Native American or Alaska Native alone (NH)	23	17	15	1.10%	1.06%	0.83%
Asian alone (NH)	6	12	24	0.29%	0.75%	1.33%
Native Hawaiian or Pacific Islander alone (NH)	4	0	10	0.19%	0.00%	0.56%
Other race alone (NH)	6	0	4	0.29%	0.00%	0.22%
Mixed race or Multiracial (NH)	25	15	74	1.20%	0.93%	4.11%
Hispanic or Latino (any race)	36	42	106	1.73%	2.61%	5.89%
Total	2,085	1,608	1,800	100.00%	100.00%	100.00%

=== 2020 census ===
As of the 2020 census, Amboy had a population of 1,800. The median age was 38.7 years. 27.2% of residents were under the age of 18 and 17.9% of residents were 65 years of age or older. For every 100 females there were 105.5 males, and for every 100 females age 18 and over there were 102.2 males age 18 and over.

0.0% of residents lived in urban areas, while 100.0% lived in rural areas.

There were 576 households in Amboy, of which 34.2% had children under the age of 18 living in them. Of all households, 64.9% were married-couple households, 17.4% were households with a male householder and no spouse or partner present, and 13.5% were households with a female householder and no spouse or partner present. About 16.6% of all households were made up of individuals and 7.8% had someone living alone who was 65 years of age or older.

There were 594 housing units, of which 3.0% were vacant. The homeowner vacancy rate was 0.0% and the rental vacancy rate was 1.6%.

Racial composition as of the 2020 census
Race	Number	Percent
White	1,606	89.2%
Black or African American	3	0.2%
American Indian and Alaska Native	24	1.3%
Asian	24	1.3%
Native Hawaiian and Other Pacific Islander	11	0.6%
Some other race	32	1.8%
Two or more races	100	5.6%

=== 2000 census ===
As of the census of 2000, there were 2,085 people, 633 households, and 529 families residing in the CDP. The population density was 145.7 people per square mile (56.3/km^{2}). There were 658 housing units at an average density of 46.0/sq mi (17.8/km^{2}). The racial makeup of the CDP was 95.78% White, 0.43% African American, 1.25% Native American, 0.29% Asian, 0.19% Pacific Islander, 0.77% from other races, and 1.29% from two or more races. Hispanic or Latino of any race were 1.73% of the population. 14.2% were of German, 14.1% Finnish, 12.6% American, 10.6% Irish, 9.5% English and 5.0% Norwegian ancestry according to Census 2000.

There were 633 households, out of which 45.2% had children under the age of 18 living with them, 74.1% were married couples living together, 5.5% had a female householder with no husband present, and 16.3% were non-families. 12.5% of all households were made up of individuals, and 4.3% had someone living alone who was 65 years of age or older. The average household size was 3.29 and the average family size was 3.61.

In the CDP, the age distribution of the population shows 36.3% under the age of 18, 7.3% from 18 to 24, 28.1% from 25 to 44, 20.8% from 45 to 64, and 7.5% who were 65 years of age or older. The median age was 31 years. For every 100 females, there were 99.7 males. For every 100 females age 18 and over, there were 103.4 males.

The median income for a household in the CDP was $50,896, and the median income for a family was $52,170. Males had a median income of $41,535 versus $22,128 for females. The per capita income for the CDP was $16,973. About 6.5% of families and 6.5% of the population were below the poverty line, including 9.2% of those under age 18 and none of those age 65 or over.

== Education ==
Most of the community is served by the Battle Ground School District. Parts in the northwest are in the Green Mountain School District. The Battle Ground district operates Amboy Middle School.

The Battle Ground portion of Amboy is zoned to Yacolt Primary School, Amboy Middle School, and Battle Ground High School.
