= Amboy United Brethren Church =

Historic church in Washington, United States

- U.S. National Register of Historic Places
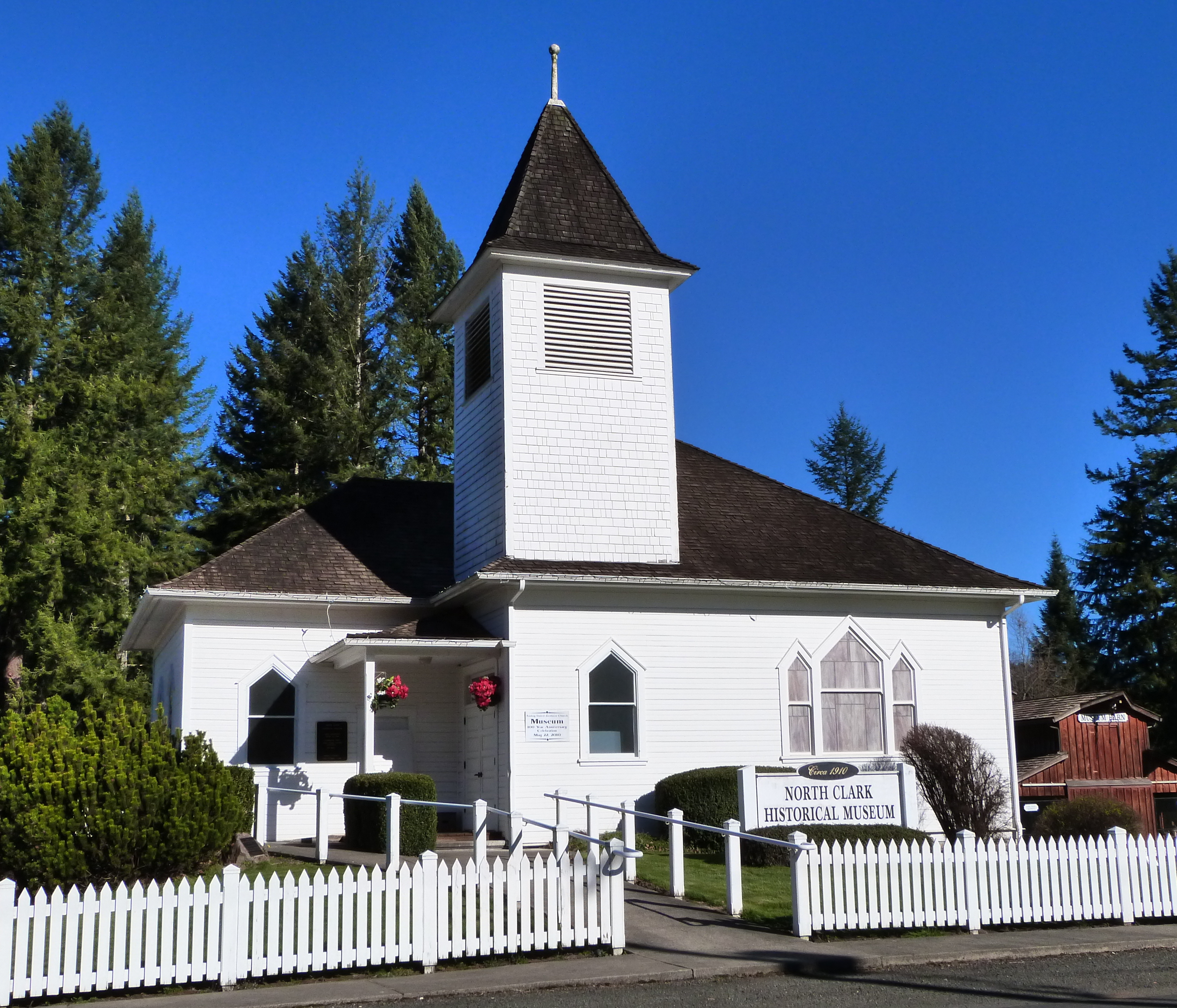
- The church's exterior in 2015

- Location within Washington (state)
- Location: 21416 NE 399th Street, Amboy, Washington
- Coordinates: 45°54′37″N 122°27′12″W
- Area: less than one acre
- Built: 1910
- Architect: Emanuel Jensen
- Architectural style: Late Gothic Revival
- NRHP reference No.: 08001184
- Added to NRHP: December 4, 2008

The Amboy United Brethren Church, also known as the Evangelical United Brethren Church and the Dora Young Chapel, is an historical church located at 21416 NE 399th Street, in Amboy, Washington.

== History ==
Built in 1910 by Emanuel Jensen in Gothic Revival style, the church was erected on a property given to the congregation by Emily Holcomb. The church was formally dedicated by Rev. Dora Young, Rev. J.L. Garret and Rev. D.L. Peterson on September 25, 1910. Due to the growing congregation, in 1936 the church was raised to install a full basement which provided meeting space, restrooms and a kitchen area. In 1946 the congregation's name was changed to the "Evangelical United Brethren Church" due to the merge of the Church of the United Brethren in Christ with the Evangelical Church. In the 1950s the church steeple was removed and by 1966 the membership had become fragmented and the building was showing signs of decay. The church was closed that same year and became a private property. In 1988 the building was offered to a group of volunteers who started a fundraising project to create a museum in the building. The North Clark Historical Museum opened on June 24, 2000. Displays include antiques and household items, photos, agriculture tools and equipment, American Indian culture, pioneer heritage and logging.

The building was listed on the National Register of Historic Places in 2008.
