= Lelooska Museum =

Native American museum in Ariel, Washington

Lelooska Foundation and Cultural Center
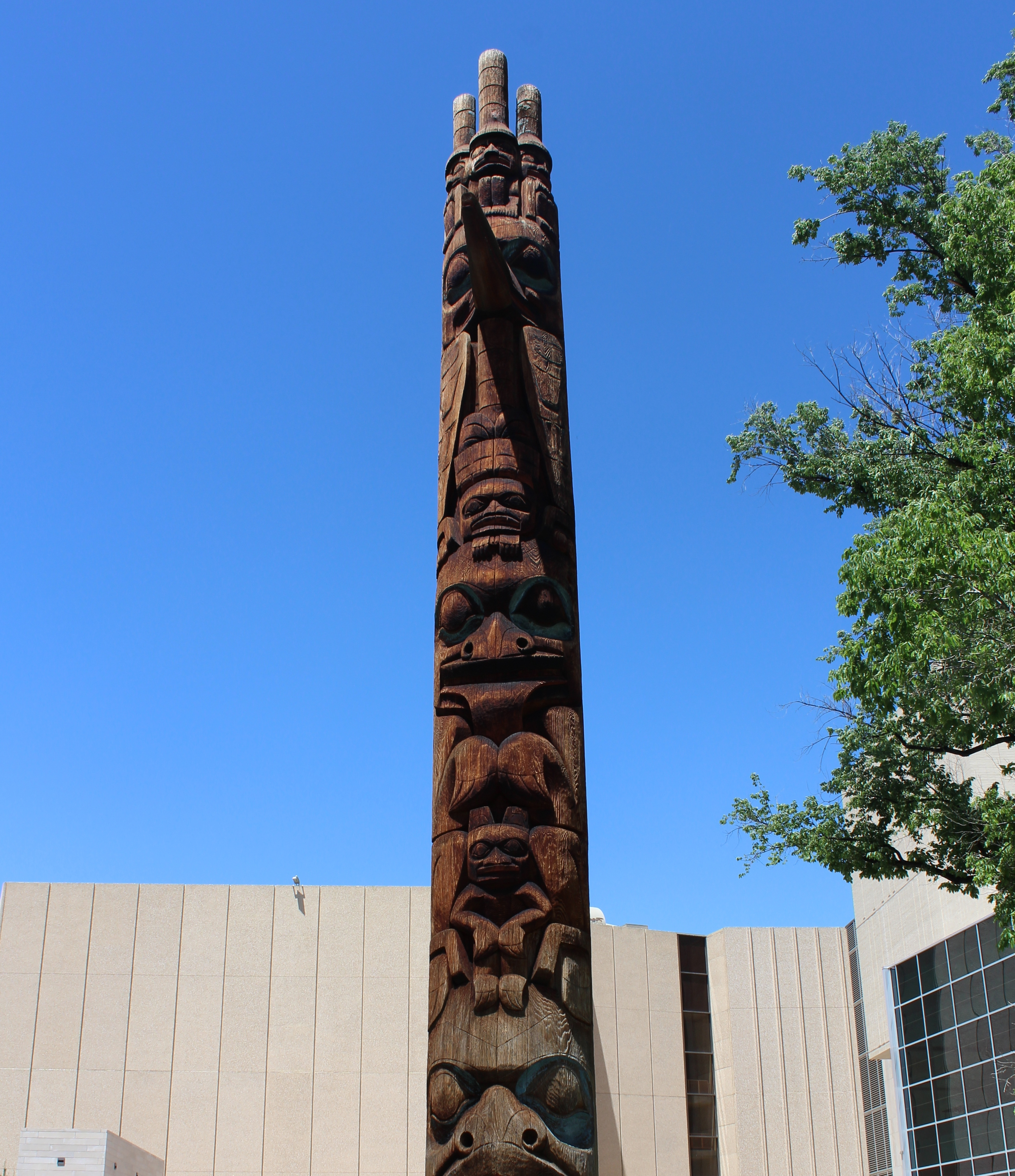
- Carved sculpture by Lelooska in Denver, Colorado
- Established: 1977
- Location: 165 Merwin Village Road; Ariel, Cowlitz County, Washington
- Coordinates: 45.957°N 122.572°W
- Type: Native American cultural
- Founders: Lelooska, Don Morse Smith
- Director: Mariah Stoll-Smith Reese
- President: Tsungani Fearon M. Smith
- Owner: Lelooska Foundation
- Website: lelooska.org

The Lelooska Foundation and Cultural Center is a living history museum in Ariel, Washington, highlighting Kwakwaka'wakw and other Indigenous cultures and histories. It is operated by the Lelooska Foundation that was established in 1977.

The museum is a nonprofit organization with nine employees.

== Collections ==
Collections include baskets, parfleches, corn husk bags, dolls, spoons, cradles, moccasins, tomahawks, pipes, pipe bags, dresses, a 15-foot birchbark canoe, and a replica fur trade store.

== Living history ==
The foundation operating the museum also sponsors living history programs and performances, conducts classes in woodcarving and other Native art forms, and demonstrations of dance and basket weaving.

== Founder ==
Lelooska, Don Morse Smith, for whom the foundation is named, was a “non-Indian/Cherokee” artist who carved sculptures and totem poles, one of which is displayed at the Christchurch International Airport in New Zealand, and another at the Oregon Zoo. Smith was given the name Lelooska by Nez Perce elders out of appreciation for a carving he made of Chief Joseph.
