= Ariel, Washington =

Unincorporated community in Washington, United States

- Unincorporated community
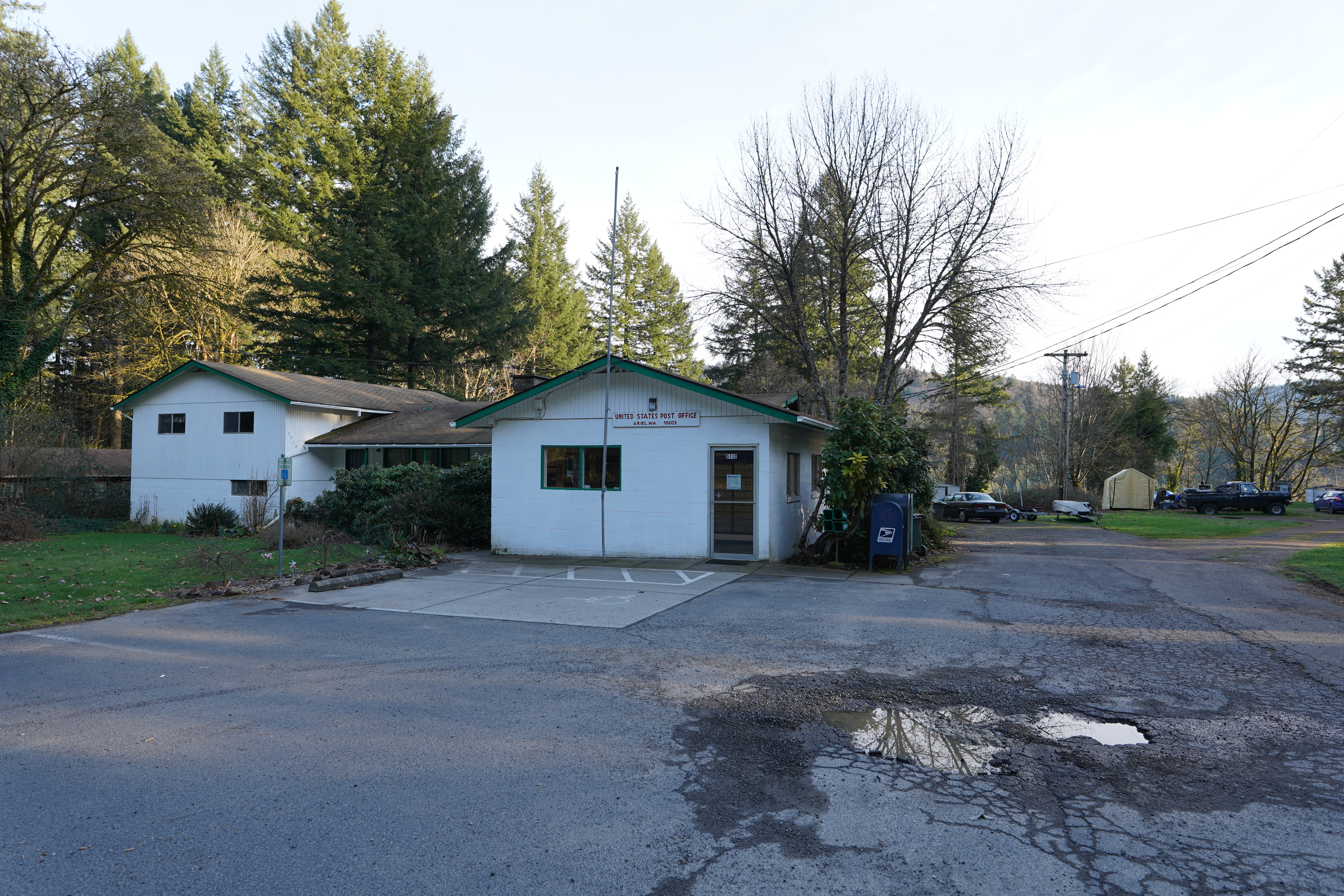
- Ariel Post Office

- Location in the state of Washington Ariel (the United States)
- Coordinates: 45°57′24″N 122°34′15″W
- Country: United States
- State: Washington
- County: Cowlitz
- Elevation: 348 ft (106 m)
- Time zone: UTC−8 (PST)
  - Summer (DST): UTC−7 (PDT)
- ZIP Code: 98603
- Area code(s): 360, 564
- FIPS code: 53-02515
- GNIS feature ID: 1510787

Ariel (/ˈɛriːəl/) is an unincorporated community in Cowlitz County, Washington. Ariel is located 11 miles (18 km) northeast of the city of Woodland along Washington State Route 503, situated north of the Lewis River and on the northwest bank of Lake Merwin. The Ariel community is part of the Woodland School District, a K-12 school district of about 2,200 students.

== Culture ==
=== Lelooska Foundation and Cultural Center ===
The Lelooska Museum is located in Ariel, Washington.

=== D. B. Cooper Days ===
Every year since 2011 the D. B. Cooper Days are held at the Ariel Store and Tavern. The festival is a celebration of the skyjacking case of Dan Cooper, who hijacked a Boeing 727 over the Cascade Mountains with US$200,000 on November 24, 1971.
