= Yale Park =

Public waterfront park in Washington, United States

Coordinates: 46°01′36″N 122°19′04″W

Yale Park is a public waterfront park located on the shores of Yale Lake in Washington, United States. Besides a great view of Mount St. Helens, Yale Park provides 30 picnic sites, parking for 130 cars and 80 trailers, a boat ramp with four lanes and a swimming beach.
