= Lewisville Park =

- U.S. National Register of Historic Places
- U.S. Historic district
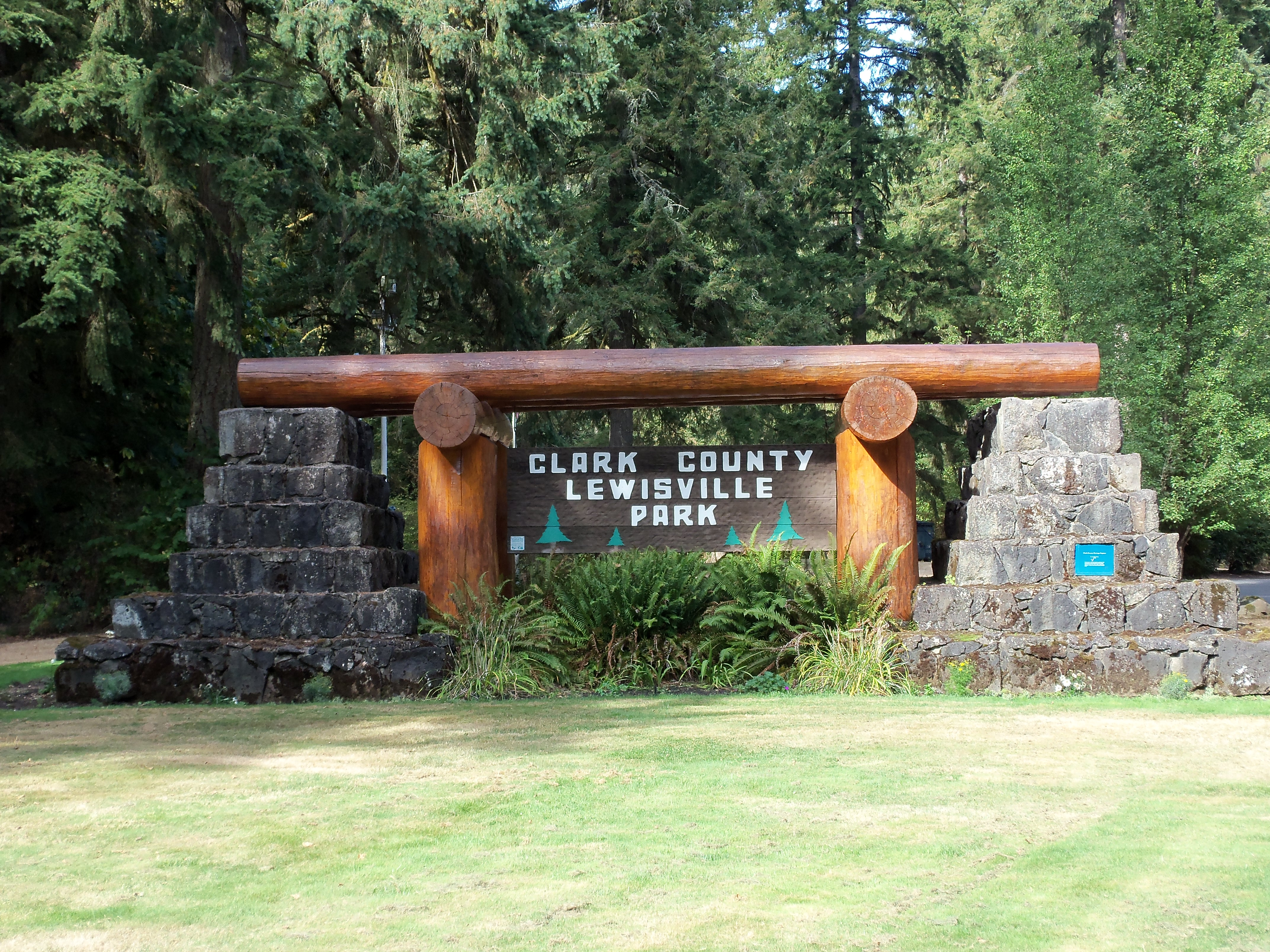

- Location within Washington (state)
- Nearest city: Battle Ground, Washington
- Coordinates: 45°49′02″N 122°32′23″W
- Area: 154 acres (62 ha)
- Built: 1936
- Built by: Works Progress Administration
- Architect: William J. Paeth
- Architectural style: Rustic
- NRHP reference No.: 86001202
- Added to NRHP: May 28, 1986

Lewisville Park is a 154-acre regional park located on the East Fork Lewis River, two miles north of Battle Ground in Clark County, Washington. It was listed on the National Register of Historic Places in 1986.

== History ==
The park was built starting in 1936 as a Works Progress Administration (WPA) recreational center project. The architecture and overall design of the park is intentionally rustic, a common idiom promoted by federal land management agencies in the early part of the 20th century. Lewisville park is the oldest in the county park system and is one of the most significant and lasting examples of the WPA in Clark County.

Several of the existing structures were built by WPA workers between 1936 and 1940 and were still existing when the park was added to the national register, including a caretaker's cottage, bathhouse, kitchen, one large and two small shelters. All were built to appear non-intrusive and used local logs and rocks in their construction. Several other buildings, not a part of the historic register list, were built in the 1950s and 1960s and maintained the natural aesthetic designs of the existing structures.

== Present day ==
Facilities include: a swimming hole (no lifeguard on duty); nature trails; playgrounds; a tennis/basketball court and sports fields; fishing; and other facilities typical of large regional asset parks.

== See also ==
- National Register of Historic Places listings in Clark County, Washington
