= Cougar, Washington =

Unincorporated community in Washington, United States

- Unincorporated community and Census-designated place
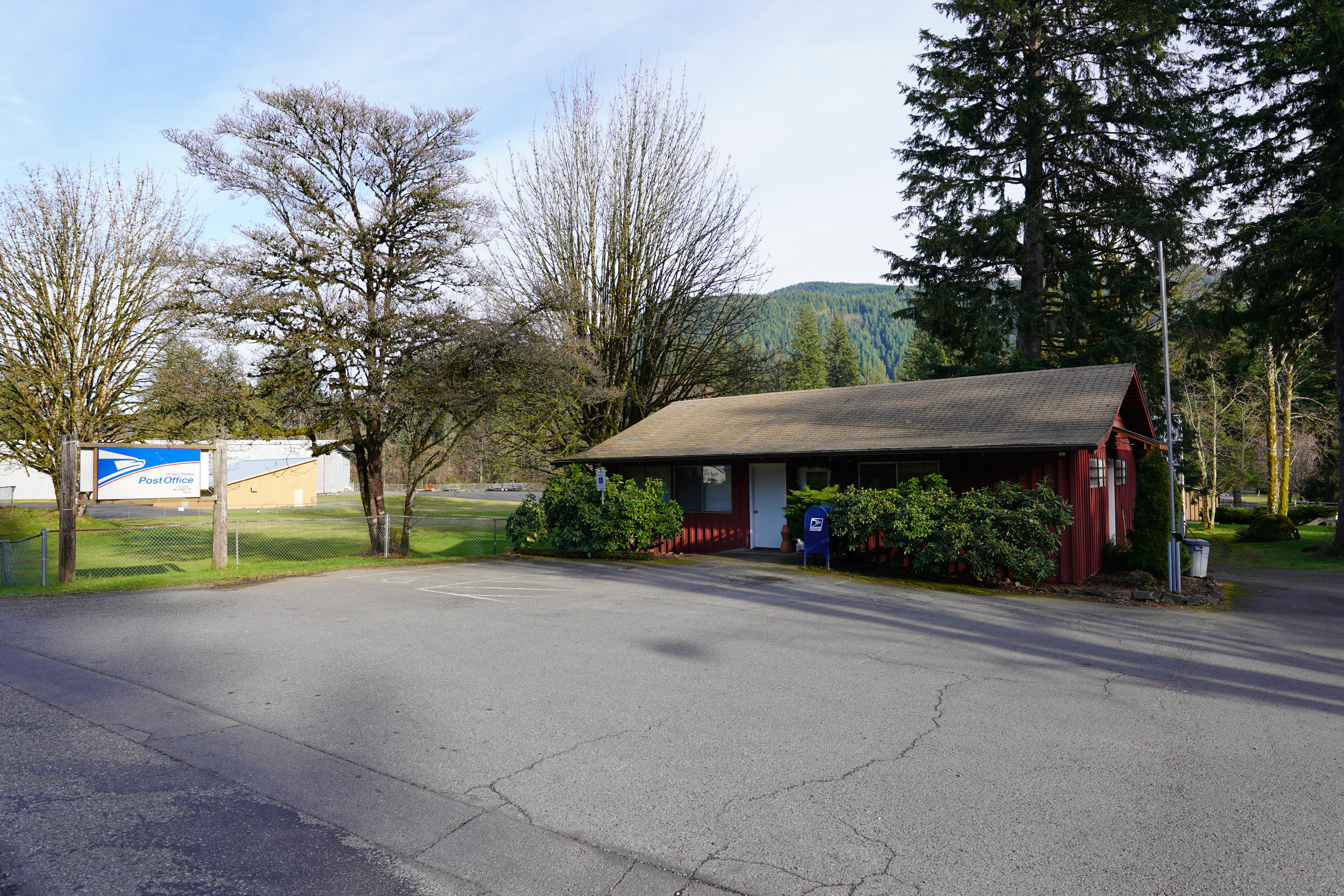
- Cougar Post Office

- Location in the state of Washington Cougar (the United States)
- Coordinates: 46°03′05″N 122°17′58″W
- Country: United States
- State: Washington
- County: Cowlitz
- Elevation: 512 ft (156 m)

Population (2020)
  - Total: 118
- Time zone: UTC−8 (PST)
  - Summer (DST): UTC−7 (PDT)
- ZIP Code: 98616
- Area code(s): 360, 564
- FIPS code: 53-15010
- GNIS feature ID: 2807175

Cougar is a census-designated place and former town in Cowlitz County, Washington. Cougar is located around 50 miles (80 km) northeast of Vancouver on Washington State Route 503 and along the northwest bank of Yale Lake, a reservoir on the Lewis River.

The population of Cougar was 122 at the 1990 Census, when it was still incorporated as a town, but disincorporated before the 2000 Census. As of the 2020 census, the population is 118.

The Cougar community is part of the Woodland School District, a K-12 school district of about 2,200 students.

Cougar is the nearest community to Mount St. Helens, which lies 13 miles (20.9215 km) to its northeast. The eruption of Mount St. Helens on May 18, 1980, was the deadliest and most economically destructive volcanic event in the history of the United States.

A post office called Cougar was established in 1902. The community was named after the cougar which were abundant in the area at that time.

== Climate ==
According to the Köppen Climate Classification system, Cougar has a warm-summer mediterranean climate, abbreviated "Csb" on climate maps. The hottest temperature recorded in Cougar was 112 °F (44.4 °C) on June 29, 2021, while the coldest temperature recorded was 4 °F (−15.6 °C) on December 30, 1968.

Climate data for Cougar, Washington, 1991–2020 normals, extremes 1943–present
Month	Jan	Feb	Mar	Apr	May	Jun	Jul	Aug	Sep	Oct	Nov	Dec	Year
Record high °F (°C)	61 (16)	69 (21)	79 (26)	91 (33)	100 (38)	112 (44)	107 (42)	108 (42)	104 (40)	92 (33)	70 (21)	60 (16)	112 (44)
Mean maximum °F (°C)	55.5 (13.1)	59.5 (15.3)	69.6 (20.9)	79.3 (26.3)	87.9 (31.1)	92.7 (33.7)	98.3 (36.8)	97.6 (36.4)	92.5 (33.6)	78.6 (25.9)	62.3 (16.8)	54.4 (12.4)	101.4 (38.6)
Mean daily maximum °F (°C)	44.8 (7.1)	48.7 (9.3)	53.8 (12.1)	59.3 (15.2)	66.8 (19.3)	72.4 (22.4)	80.4 (26.9)	80.9 (27.2)	75.1 (23.9)	62.7 (17.1)	50.4 (10.2)	43.9 (6.6)	61.6 (16.4)
Daily mean °F (°C)	39.7 (4.3)	41.9 (5.5)	45.6 (7.6)	49.7 (9.8)	56.1 (13.4)	61.1 (16.2)	67.2 (19.6)	67.3 (19.6)	62.9 (17.2)	53.7 (12.1)	44.7 (7.1)	39.0 (3.9)	52.4 (11.4)
Mean daily minimum °F (°C)	34.6 (1.4)	35.2 (1.8)	37.3 (2.9)	40.1 (4.5)	45.5 (7.5)	49.7 (9.8)	54.0 (12.2)	53.8 (12.1)	50.8 (10.4)	44.8 (7.1)	39.0 (3.9)	34.0 (1.1)	43.2 (6.2)
Mean minimum °F (°C)	25.3 (−3.7)	27.6 (−2.4)	30.3 (−0.9)	32.6 (0.3)	36.7 (2.6)	41.2 (5.1)	45.4 (7.4)	45.7 (7.6)	42.0 (5.6)	36.6 (2.6)	29.3 (−1.5)	25.7 (−3.5)	20.2 (−6.6)
Record low °F (°C)	8 (−13)	5 (−15)	15 (−9)	28 (−2)	29 (−2)	33 (1)	38 (3)	38 (3)	34 (1)	28 (−2)	12 (−11)	4 (−16)	4 (−16)
Average precipitation inches (mm)	17.01 (432)	12.97 (329)	12.34 (313)	9.08 (231)	5.41 (137)	4.10 (104)	1.24 (31)	1.65 (42)	3.85 (98)	9.11 (231)	18.65 (474)	17.33 (440)	112.74 (2,862)
Average snowfall inches (cm)	6.0 (15)	3.5 (8.9)	1.6 (4.1)	0.2 (0.51)	0.0 (0.0)	0.0 (0.0)	0.0 (0.0)	0.0 (0.0)	0.0 (0.0)	0.0 (0.0)	0.6 (1.5)	3.6 (9.1)	15.5 (39.11)
Average precipitation days (≥ 0.01 in)	20.9	17.2	20.4	18.2	14.9	11.7	5.3	4.7	8.3	14.8	21.0	19.8	177.2
Average snowy days (≥ 0.1 in)	2.1	1.2	0.6	0.1	0.0	0.0	0.0	0.0	0.0	0.0	0.6	1.7	6.3
Source 1: NOAA
Source 2: National Weather Service

== Education ==
Cougar is in the territory of Woodland Public Schools, which operates Woodland High School.

== Demographics ==
Historical population
Census	Pop.	Note	%±
2020	118		—
U.S. Decennial Census

Cougar first appeared as a census designated place in the 2020 U.S. census.

=== Racial and ethnic composition ===
Cougar CDP, Washington – Racial and ethnic composition Note: the US Census treats Hispanic/Latino as an ethnic category. This table excludes Latinos from the racial categories and assigns them to a separate category. Hispanics/Latinos may be of any race.
Race / Ethnicity (NH = Non-Hispanic)	Pop 2020	2020
White alone (NH)	111	94.07%
Black or African American alone (NH)	0	0.00%
Native American or Alaska Native alone (NH)	0	0.00%
Asian alone (NH)	0	0.00%
Native Hawaiian or Pacific Islander alone (NH)	0	0.00%
Other race alone (NH)	0	0.00%
Mixed race or Multiracial (NH)	1	0.85%
Hispanic or Latino (any race)	6	5.08%
Total	118	100.00%
