= East Fork Lewis River =

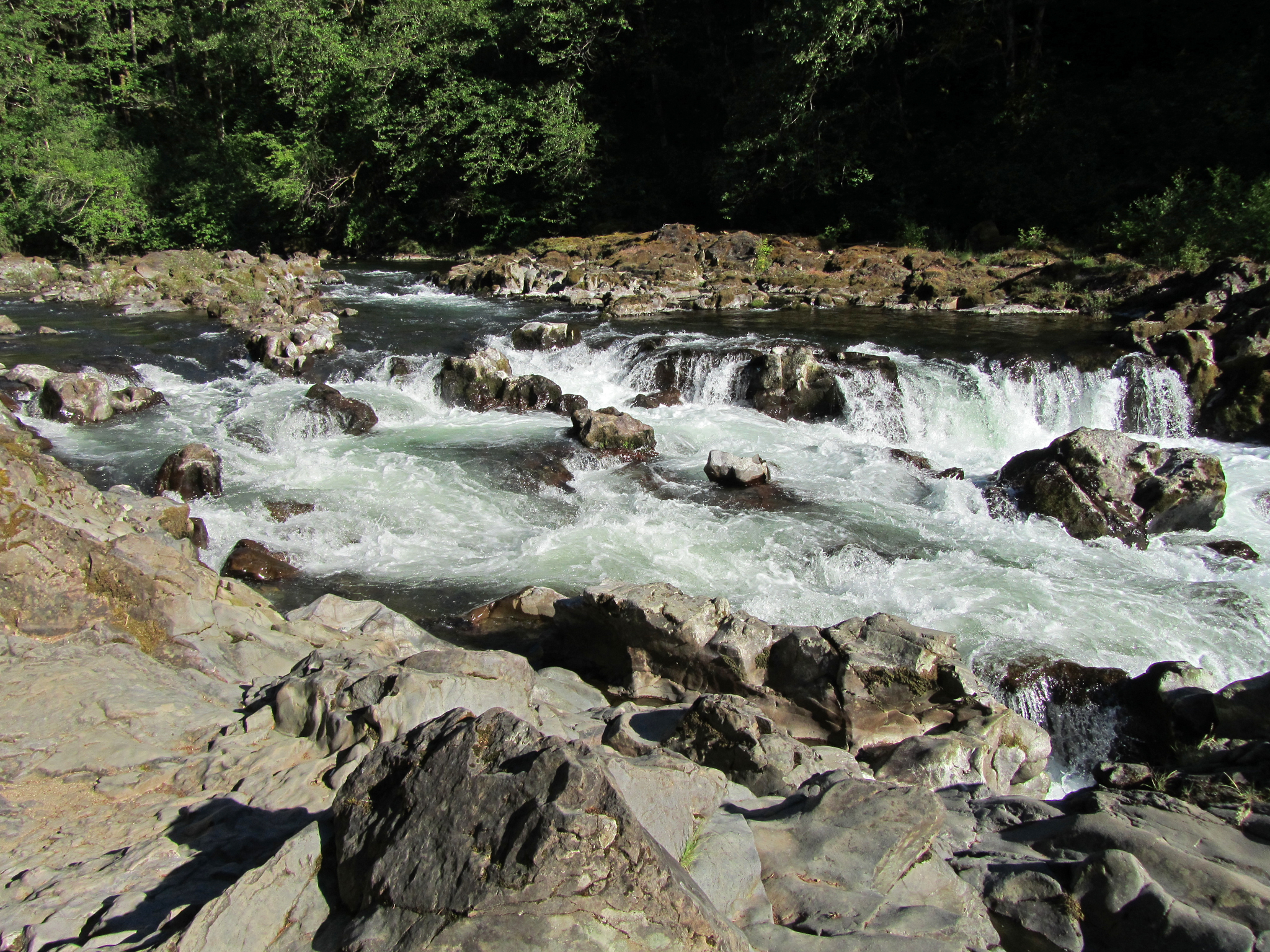
- The East Fork Lewis River at Moulton Falls Park

- Location of the mouth of the Lewis River in Washington East Fork Lewis River (the United States)
- Etymology: A. Lee Lewis, early settler
- Native name: Yahkohtl (Yakama) (Klickitat people)

Location
- Country: United States
- State: Washington
- County: Skamania and Clark

Physical characteristics
- Source: Green Lookout Mountain
  - location: Skamania County
  - coordinates: 45°50′33″N 122°05′56″W
  - elevation: 4,442 ft (1,354 m)
- Mouth: Lewis River
  - location: Ridgefield, Washington
  - coordinates: 45°51′57″N 122°43′08″W
  - elevation: 10 ft (3.0 m)
- Length: 43.5 mi (70.0 km)
- Basin size: 150,635 acres

Basin features
- Waterfalls: Sunset Falls, Moulton Falls, Lucia Falls

The East Fork Lewis River is a river in the state of Washington in the United States. It is the largest tributary of the Lewis River. Its source is on Green Lookout Mountain in Skamania County. It then flows to the west through Clark County until it converges with the Lewis about 3.5 mi (5.6 km) upstream from the Columbia River.

== History ==
When George B. McClellan was on the Northern Pacific Railroad Survey in 1853, he logged information in his journals about his visit to the Yacolt area, including the East Fork Lewis River. McClellan observed a few Klickitat families camped at a waterfall on the Yahkohtl River (a Klickitat name for the East Fork). He described them as "plateau-style Indians" that rode horses and were armed with a shotgun. He observed these people catching trout from the river. McClellan also noted several waterfalls along the river, which he suggested may be suitable for power generation.

Unlike many "Lewis" names in the region that reference Meriwether Lewis, the Lewis River was named by an unrelated Adolphus Lewis, a former Hudson's Bay employee who was an early settler in the area.

Mills were constructed at multiple points along the East Fork after the Yacolt Burn of 1902. They served to salvage partially-burned timber and were dismantled once that task was complete. Two waterfalls on the river, Moulton Falls and Lucia Falls bear the surnames of the owners of mills that were once powered by them.

== Course ==
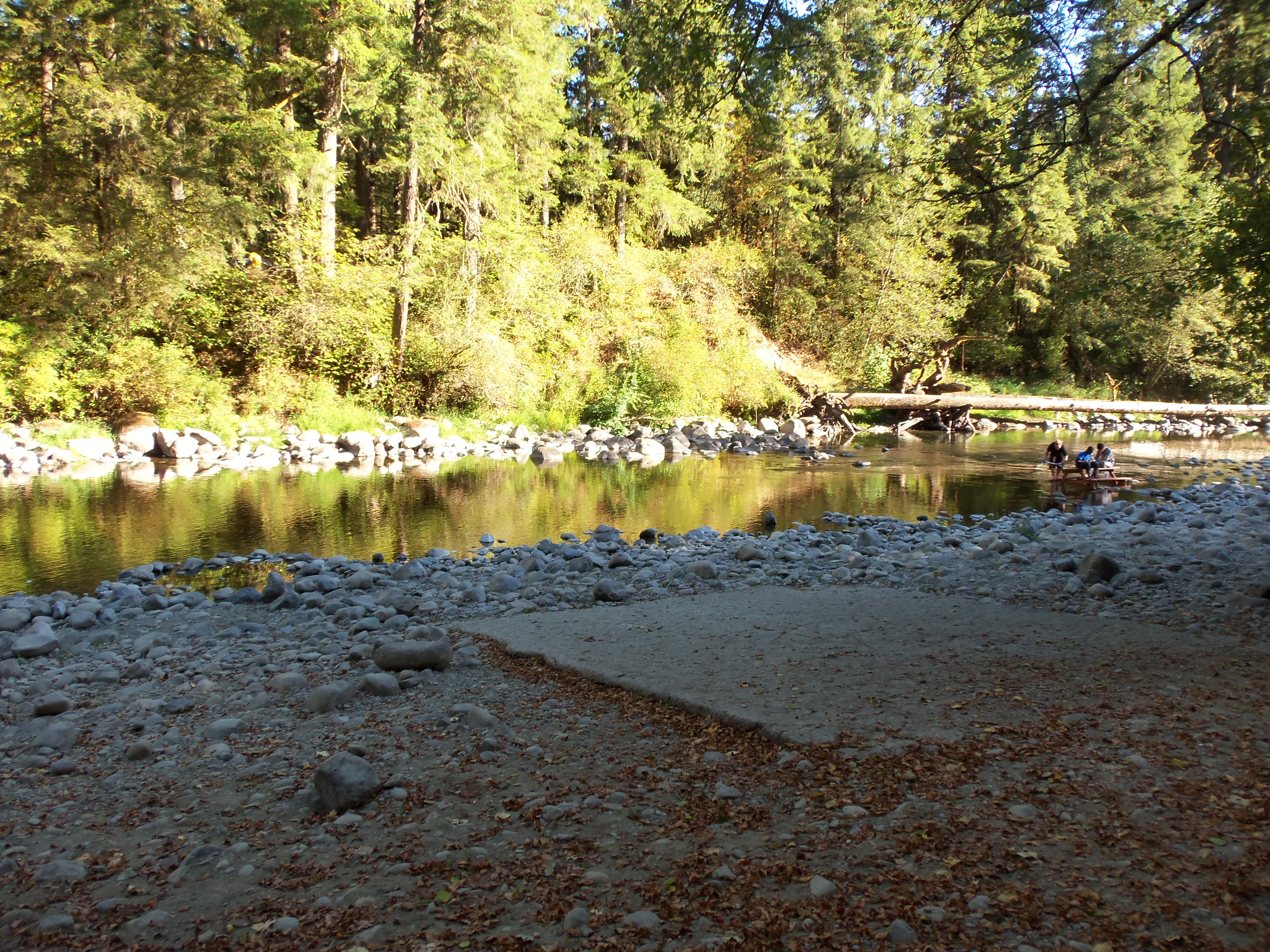
Lewisville Park Boat Launch

The East Fork Lewis River begins on the west slope of Green Lookout Mountain, in the southwest corner of the Gifford Pinchot National Forest in Skamania County. From there it flows primarily westward, with the majority of its basin lying in Clark County.

Its first notable feature is Sunset Falls, followed by its convergence with Yacolt Creek at Moulton Falls Regional Park, south of Yacolt. The river then spills over Moulton Falls and Lucia Falls, before flowing north of Battle Ground through Lewisville Park, Clark County's oldest county park. From there, the river continues westward, through Daybreak Park, and onward to the confluence with Breeze Creek, just before passing through La Center. Shortly after flowing past the town, the East Fork curves around Paradise Point just before it merges with the main fork of the Lewis River.

== Sources ==
The East Fork's headwaters flow through steep, narrow, rocky valleys, forming a canyon in some places. Copper Creek and Upper Rock Creek are its largest primary tributaries. Elevation at the source is approximately 4,442 ft (1,354 m).

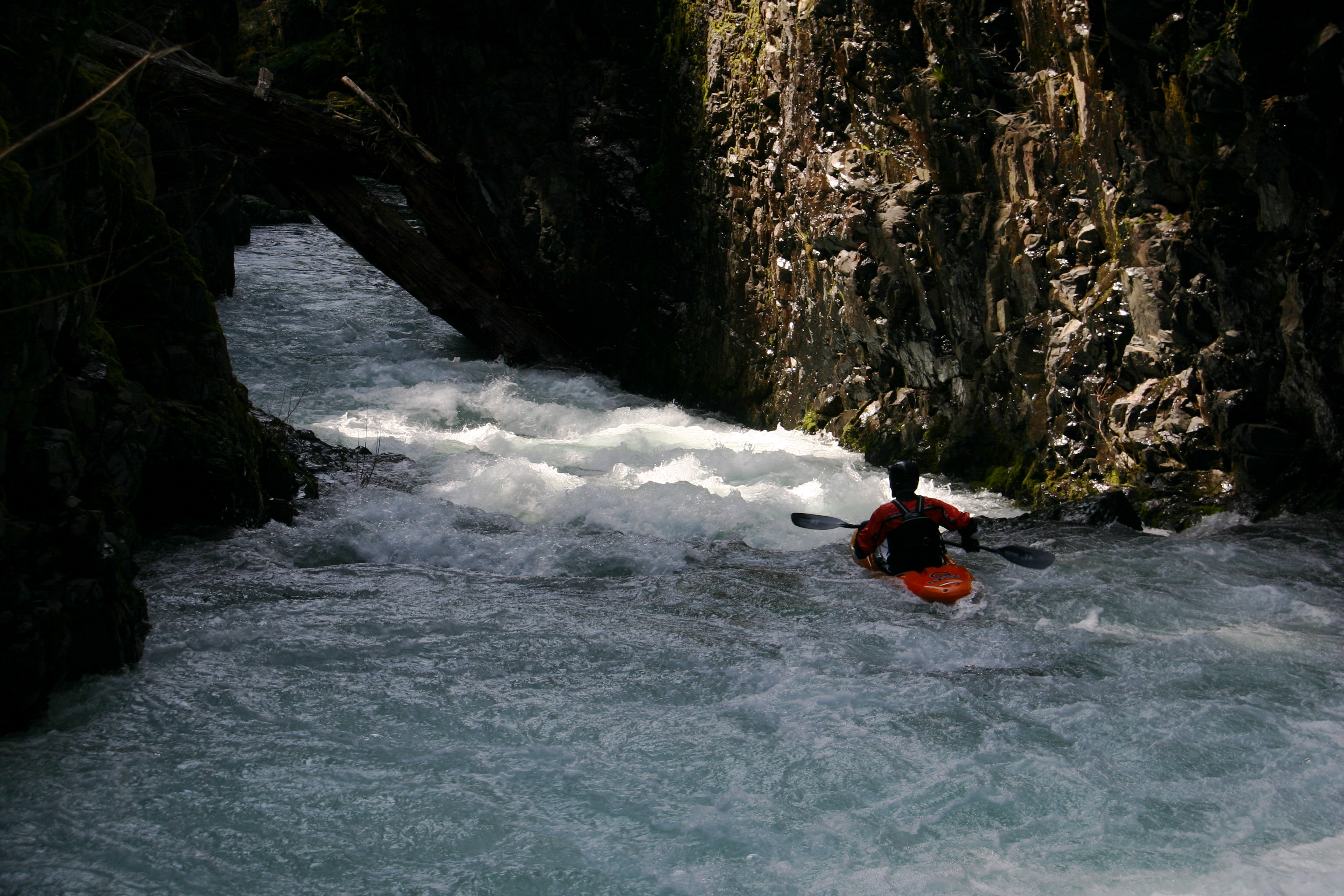
East Fork Lewis River kayaker

== Watershed ==
The East Fork's basin is approximately 150,635 acres. The rocky upper basin was formed by erosion as well as volcanic and glacial processes, while the lower reaches of the basin have been formed primarily through erosion as the river flows through alluvial flatlands. The lower basin has a much lower gradient than the upper, and shifting sediment deposits cause frequent meandering and braiding. The upper basin has a large amount of hardened volcanic ash, pumice, and other pyroclastic material. With the presence of these brittle materials combined with its steep gradient, it experiences high levels of erosion, contributing to the sediment deposits downstream.

== River modifications ==
Sunset Falls was a historic natural barrier for anadromous fish migration. The falls were notched in 1982, reducing their height from 13.5 ft (4.1 m) to 8 ft (2.4 m). This change allowed 12% of the current steelhead run to spawn upstream from the falls.

== Wildlife ==
Many varieties of trout and salmon live and spawn in the East Fork, including Chinook, coho, chum, and steelhead. The Washington state record winter-run steelhead, weighing 32.75 pounds, was caught in the East Fork in 1982. In 2014, the East Fork was designated as a wild steelhead gene bank by the Washington State Department of Fish and Wildlife.

== See also ==
- List of rivers of Washington (state)
- Tributaries of the Columbia River
