= Merwin Dam =

- Location: Clark / Cowlitz counties, Washington, USA
- Coordinates: 45°57′24″N 122°33′18″W
- Construction began: 1929
- Opening date: 1931
- Operator(s): Pacificorp

Dam and spillways
- Impounds: Lewis River
- Height: 313 feet (95 m)
- Length: 1,250 feet (381 m)

Reservoir
- Creates: Lake Merwin
- Total capacity: 422,000 acre-feet (0.521 km^{3})
- Catchment area: 731 square miles (1,890 km^{2})
- Surface area: 3,921 acres (15.9 km^{2})

Power Station
- Commission date: 1931/1949/1958
- Turbines: 3 x 45 MW Francis-type, 1 x 1 MW
- Installed capacity: 136 MW
- Annual generation: 511,534 MWh

Merwin Dam (also known as Ariel Dam) is a concrete arch gravity-type hydroelectric dam on the Lewis River, in the U.S. state of Washington. It is located on the border between Cowlitz County and Clark County. Its reservoir is called Lake Merwin.

On November 24, 1971, the dam was fully lit allegedly giving the skyjacker D. B. Cooper an identifiable landmark when he jumped from a Boeing 727 passenger liner. Cooper had ransomed 200,000 dollars from Federal Authorities after holding hostage the 727 and its passengers in Seattle.
