= Yale Dam =

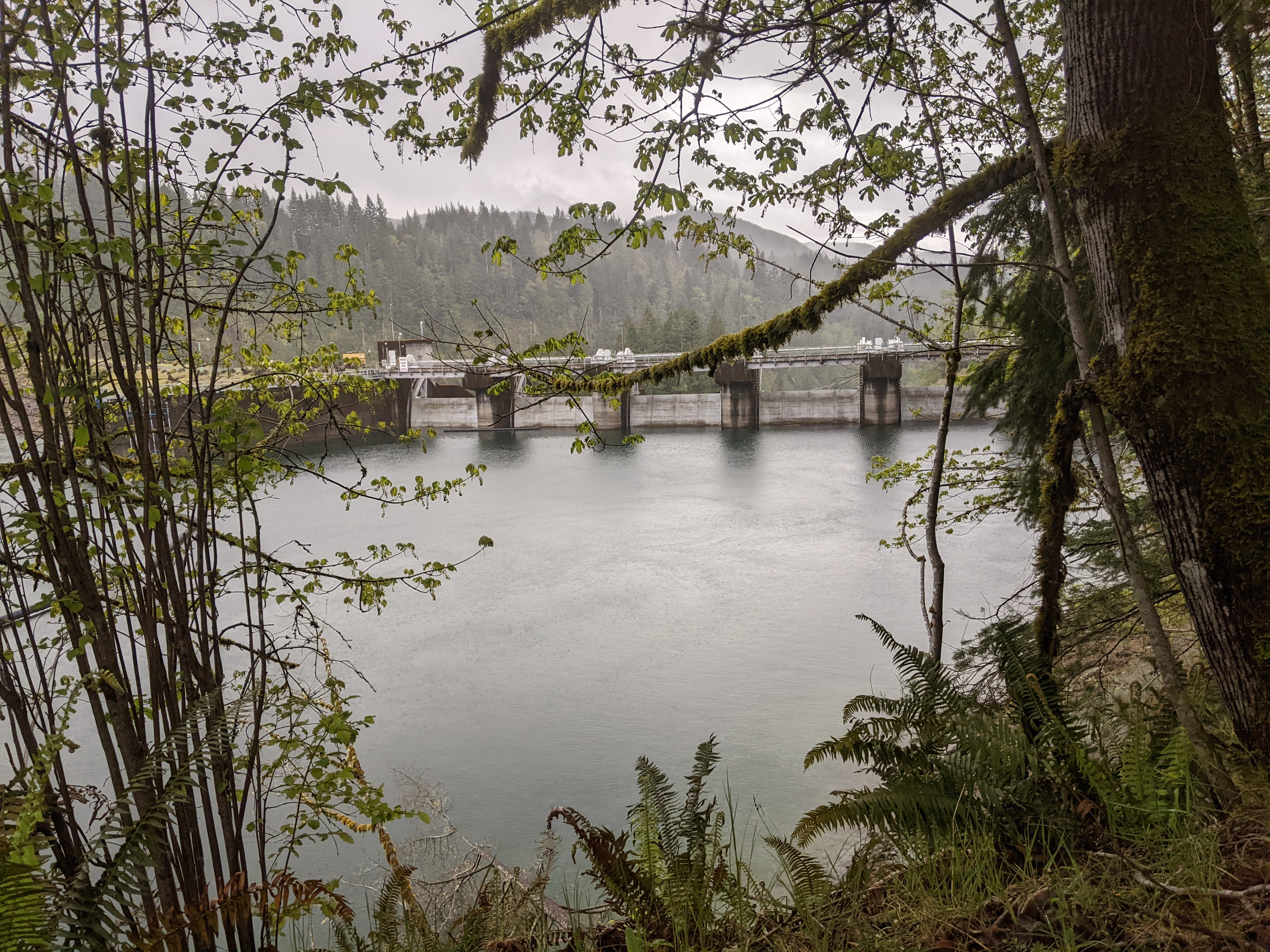
- Yale Dam, north side
- Interactive map of Yale Dam
- Location: Clark / Cowlitz counties, Washington, USA
- Coordinates: 45°57′51″N 122°19′57″W
- Status: Operational
- Opening date: 1953
- Designed by: Ebasco Services Inc.
- Operator: PacifiCorp

Dam and spillways
- Type of dam: Embankment dam
- Impounds: Lewis River
- Height: 323 feet (98.5 m)
- Length: 1,500 feet (457 m)
- Elevation at crest: 460 feet (140 m)
- Spillway type: Gated concrete ogee/chute
- Spillway length: 195 feet (59.4 m)

Reservoir
- Creates: Yale Lake
- Total capacity: 402,000 acre-feet (0.496 km^{3})
- Catchment area: 600 square miles (1,550 km^{2})

Power Station
- Hydraulic head: 240 square miles (622 km^{2})
- Turbines: 2
- Installed capacity: 134,000 kW

Yale Dam is a 323-foot high earth-type hydroelectric dam on the Lewis River, in the U.S. state of Washington, owned by PacifiCorp. It is located on the border between Cowlitz County and Clark County. Its reservoir is called Yale Lake. The dam's power plant capacity is 134 megawatts.

In January 2020, PacifiCorp, the dam owner, lowered the reservoir level 10 feet below normal operating level in order to reduce the probability of an accidental release due to an earthquake.
