= Yale Lake =

Lake in the United States

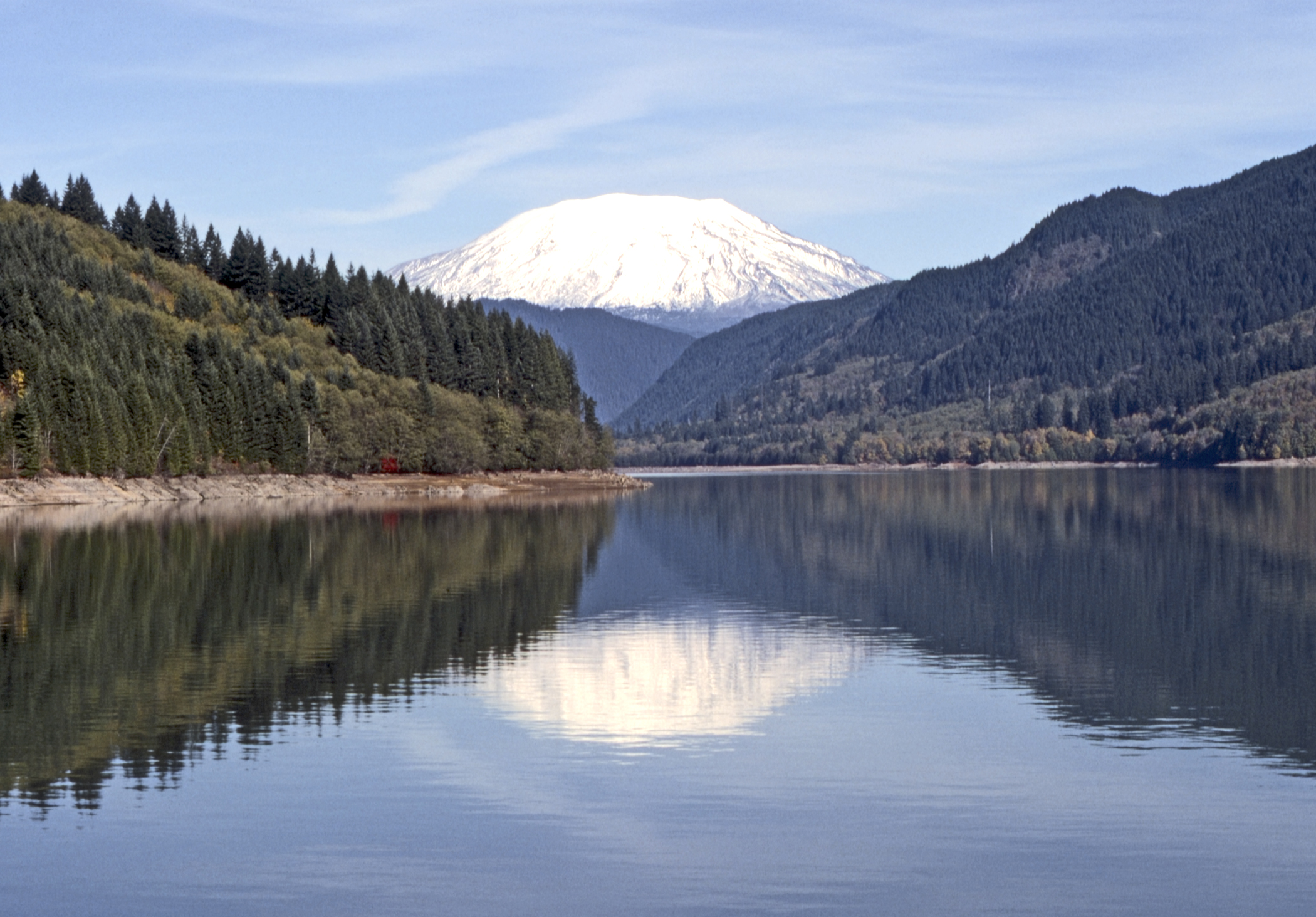
- Yale Lake with Mount St. Helens in distance

- Location within Washington (state) Location within the United States
- Location: Clark / Cowlitz counties, Washington
- Coordinates: 45°57′51″N 122°19′57″W
- Type: reservoir
- Primary inflows: Lewis River
- Primary outflows: Lewis River
- Catchment area: 600 square miles (1,550 km^{2})
- Basin countries: United States
- Surface area: 3,780 acres (15.3 km^{2})
- Max. depth: 246 ft (75 m)
- Water volume: 401,760 acre⋅ft (0.496 km^{3})
- Surface elevation: 486 ft (148 m)

Yale Lake is a 3,780 acre reservoir on the Lewis River in the U.S. state of Washington. It lies on the border between Clark County and Cowlitz County. It was created in 1953 with the construction of Yale Dam.

== Climate ==
Climate data for Yale Lake, Washington
Month	Jan	Feb	Mar	Apr	May	Jun	Jul	Aug	Sep	Oct	Nov	Dec	Year
Average precipitation inches (mm)	16.9 (430)	14.9 (380)	13.3 (340)	7.1 (180)	4.7 (120)	4 (100)	1.3 (33)	1.5 (38)	5 (130)	11.6 (290)	18.2 (460)	20.8 (530)	119.3 (3,030)
Average snowfall inches (cm)	0.8 (2.0)	0.0 (0.0)	0.0 (0.0)	0.0 (0.0)	0.0 (0.0)	0.0 (0.0)	0.0 (0.0)	0.0 (0.0)	0.0 (0.0)	0.2 (0.51)	0.0 (0.0)	0.5 (1.3)	1.5 (3.8)
Average precipitation days (≥ 0.01 in.)	17	17	19	14	12	10	3	5	8	15	18	21	159
Source: weatherbase.com

== See also ==
- List of lakes in Washington (state)
- List of dams in the Columbia River watershed
