= Lake Merwin =

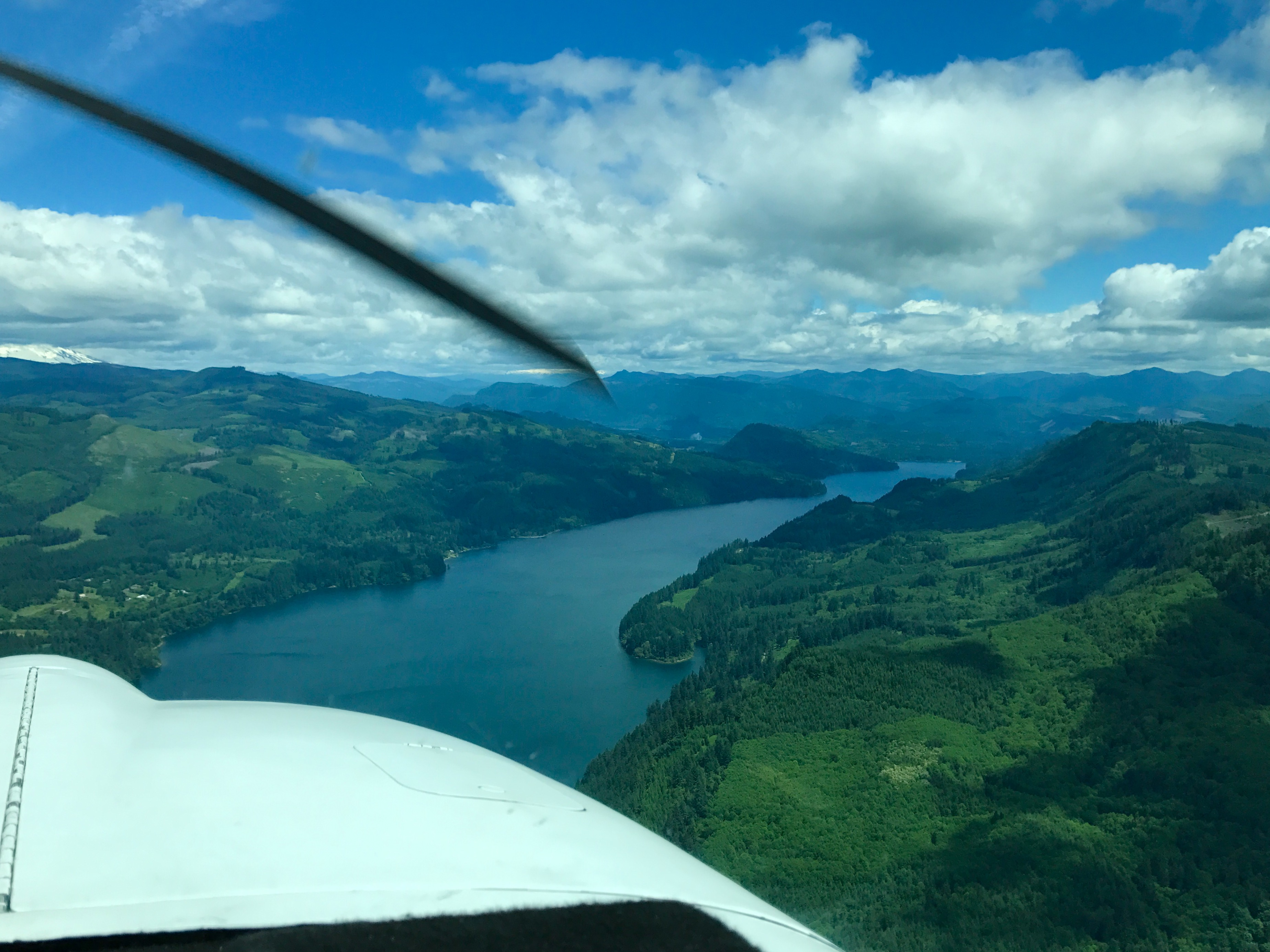
- Aerial view of Lake Merwin

- Location within Washington (state) Location within the United States
- Location: Clark / Cowlitz counties, Washington
- Coordinates: 45°59′N 122°28′W
- Type: reservoir
- Primary inflows: Lewis River
- Primary outflows: Lewis River
- Catchment area: 731 square miles (1,890 km^{2})
- Basin countries: United States
- Surface area: 3,921 acres (15.9 km^{2})
- Max. depth: 190 ft (58 m)
- Water volume: 422,400 acre-feet (0.521 km^{3})
- Shore length^{1}: 32 mi (51 km)
- Surface elevation: 236 ft (72 m)
- ^{1} Shore length is not a well-defined measure.

Lake Merwin is a reservoir on the Lewis River in the U.S. state of Washington. It lies on the border between Clark County and Cowlitz County. It was created in 1931 with the construction of Merwin Dam.

== See also ==
- List of lakes in Washington (state)
- List of dams in the Columbia River watershed
