= Lewis River (Washington) =

Columbia River tributary

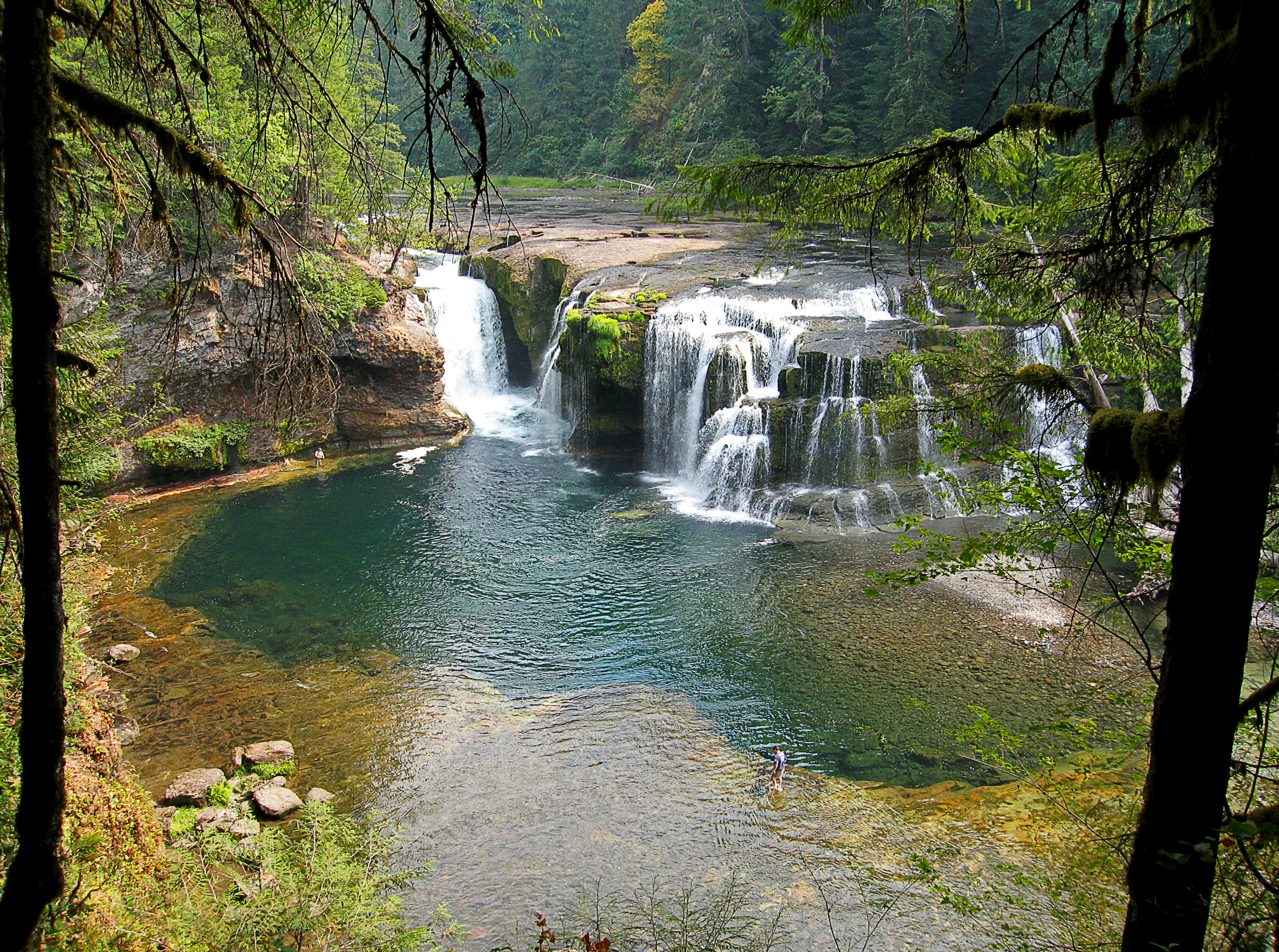
- Lower Falls of the Lewis River

- Location of the mouth of the Lewis River in Washington Lewis River (Washington) (the United States)
- Etymology: A. Lee Lewis, early settler

Location
- Country: United States
- State: Washington
- County: Skamania, Clark, and Cowlitz

Physical characteristics
- Source: Mount Adams
  - location: Cascade Range, Skamania County, Washington
  - coordinates: 46°13′28″N 121°31′44″W
  - elevation: 7,194 ft (2,193 m)
- Mouth: Columbia River
  - location: opposite St. Helens, Oregon, and on the border between Cowlitz and Clark counties, Washington
  - coordinates: 45°51′04″N 122°46′49″W
  - elevation: 10 ft (3.0 m)
- Length: 95 mi (153 km)
- Basin size: 1,046 sq mi (2,710 km^{2})
- Discharge
  - location: mouth (average); max and min at Ariel, WA
  - average: 6,125 cu ft/s (173.4 m^{3}/s)
  - minimum: 807.2 cu ft/s (22.86 m^{3}/s)
  - maximum: 129,000 cu ft/s (3,700 m^{3}/s)

The Lewis River is a tributary of the Columbia River, about 95 miles (153 km) long, in southwestern Washington in the United States. It drains part of the Cascade Range north of the Columbia River. The drainage basin of the Lewis River covers about 1,046 square miles (2,709 km^{2}). The river's mean annual discharge is about 6,125 cubic feet per second (173.4 m^{3}/s). Unlike nearby Lewis County and Fort Lewis the Lewis River was not named for Meriwether Lewis, but rather for A. Lee Lewis, an early pioneer who homesteaded near the mouth of the river.

== History ==
The first inhabitants of the Lewis drainage were a number of Native American tribes. Tribal listings compiled by anthropologist Verne F. Ray mention a village about 5 miles (8.0 km) upstream from the mouth of the Lewis, which was originally populated by the Cowlitz, but transitioned after 1830 to a Klickitat population. Lewis and Clark encountered a tribe on the Lewis River that they referred to as "Cathlapotles," which are thought to be Chinook, but they also recorded a Sahaptin-speaking village near the mouth of the Lewis, which were likely Klickitat people. Like almost all Native tribes, Indigenous groups on the Lewis River experienced a population collapse as a result of an 1830 epidemic introduced by early colonizers. This is one of the reasons many early recorded observations include large shifts and changes in tribal populations.

One of the first recorded sightings of the Lewis by a non Indigenous person was in 1792, when William Robert Broughton passed the mouth of the Lewis while exploring the Columbia River during the Vancouver Expedition. He named it Rushleigh's River at that time. At the time Lewis and Clark crossed the river, they had already named the Snake River the Lewis, and referred to the present-day Lewis as the Cathlapoote. Other historically recorded names include the Kattlepoutal and Washington River.

The Donation Land Claim Act of 1850 brought an influx of colonizers to the region, but just prior to that in 1845, Adolphus Lee Lewis retired from the Hudson's Bay Company and established a land claim near present day Woodland. Lewis became the county surveyor in 1856, and applied his own name to the river.

== Course ==
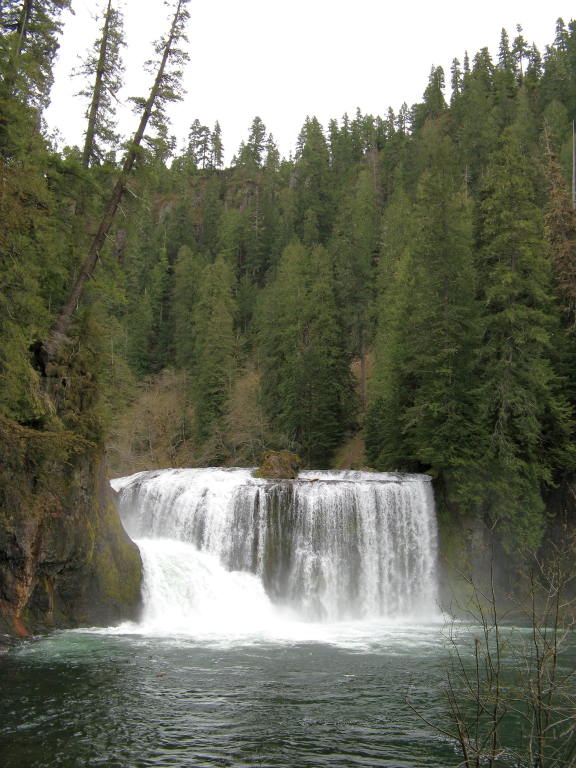
Upper Falls

The Lewis River rises in the Cascades in northeastern Skamania County, high on the west flank of Mount Adams, approximately 75 miles (121 km) northeast of Portland, Oregon. It flows generally southwest through Gifford Pinchot National Forest, across central Skamania County, passing south of Mount St. Helens. It forms the boundary, along the Dark Divide on its north side, between Cowlitz County, to the north, and Clark County, to the south. Towns along the river include Cougar, Ariel, and Woodland. In its lower 10 miles (16 km), it turns sharply south, then west, and enters the Columbia from the east, opposite St. Helens, Oregon, approximately 15 miles (24 km) north of Vancouver, Washington. The mouth of the Lewis River is at Columbia river mile (RM) 87 or river kilometer (RK) 140.

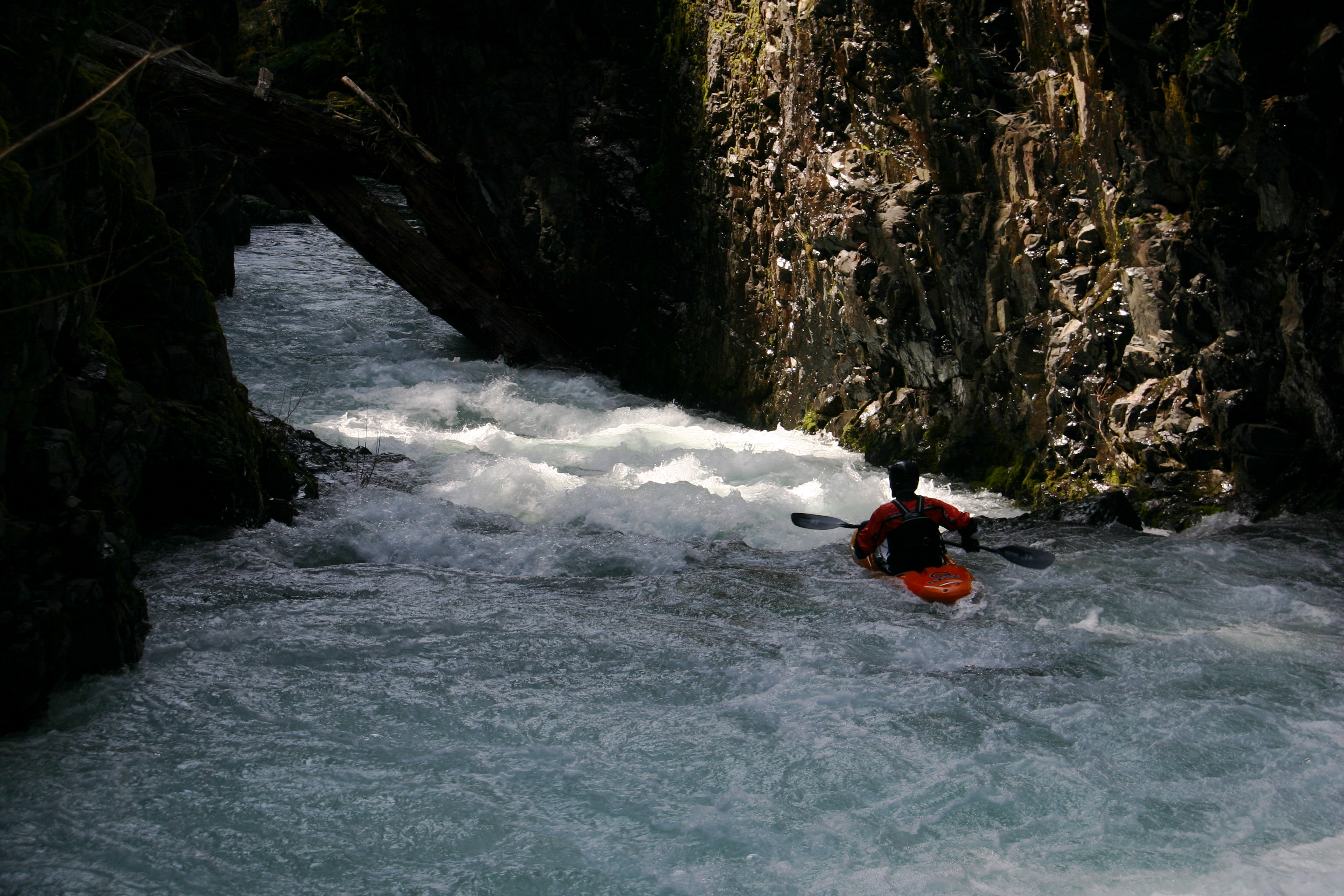
Kayaker in the gorge of East Fork Lewis River (Dragon's Back)

Near the confluence with the Columbia River, the Lewis River is joined by the East Fork Lewis River. The main Lewis River, sometimes called the North Fork Lewis River, forms the boundary between Clark and Cowlitz counties, while the East Fork divides Clark County in half. The East Fork flows westward from headwaters on the western flanks of Lookout Mountain in Skamania County. Parks along the East Fork include Moulton Falls, Lucia Falls, Lewisville, and Paradise Point. A variant name of the East Fork is the South Fork Lewis River.

== River modifications ==
The North Fork is impounded for hydroelectricity and flood control in its middle course by Swift Dam, forming Swift Reservoir; Yale Dam, forming Yale Lake; and Merwin Dam, forming Lake Merwin.

Horseshoe Lake in Woodland is a former oxbow of the North Fork. Beginning in 1940, the construction of U.S. Highway 99 (later to become the Interstate 5 corridor in this area), resulted in the construction of a dike that straightened the river to the east of the highway before it flows under what is now Interstate 5 near the Woodland southern boundary.

== See also ==
- List of rivers of Washington (state)
- Tributaries of the Columbia River
