= Larch (disambiguation) =

A larch is a tree.

Larch, or Larches may also refer to:

- Larch family of computer specification languages
- Larch, Michigan, a community in the United States
- Larch Hill, headquarters of Scouting Ireland
- Larches, Preston, a district of Preston, in Lancashire, England
- The Larches (Cambridge, Massachusetts), a building in Cambridge, Massachusetts
- Larch Mountain (Multnomah County, Oregon), an extinct volcano between Portland and Mount Hood
- Larch Mountain (Washington County, Oregon), in the northern Oregon Coast Range near Timber, Oregon
- Larch Mountain (Clark County, Washington), between Vancouver and Silver Star Mountain
- Larch Mountain (Clark County, Washington), in the Black Hills WSW of Olympia and south of Shelton

== People ==
- John Larch (1914–2005), American radio, film, and television actor
- Larch Campbell Renshaw, American architect

== Technology ==
- Larch a British rocket engine.
- USS Larch (AN-21), an Aloe-class net laying ship which was assigned to serve the U.S. Navy during World War II

== See also ==
- Larch Mountain (disambiguation)
- Larch bolete, a number of fungi in the order Boletales which occur in association with species of larch
