= Larch Mountain =

Larch Mountain may refer to:

- Larch Mountain (Washington County, Oregon)
- Larch Mountain (Multnomah County, Oregon)
- Larch Mountain (Clark County, Washington)
- Larch Mountain (Thurston County, Washington)
- Larch Mountain (Kootenai County, Idaho)
- Larch Mountain (Shoshone County, Idaho)
