= Mark O. Hatfield Memorial Trail =

Proposed hiking trail in Oregon, U.S.

Coordinates: 45.5°N 121.8°W

Mark O. Hatfield Memorial Trail (Proposed)
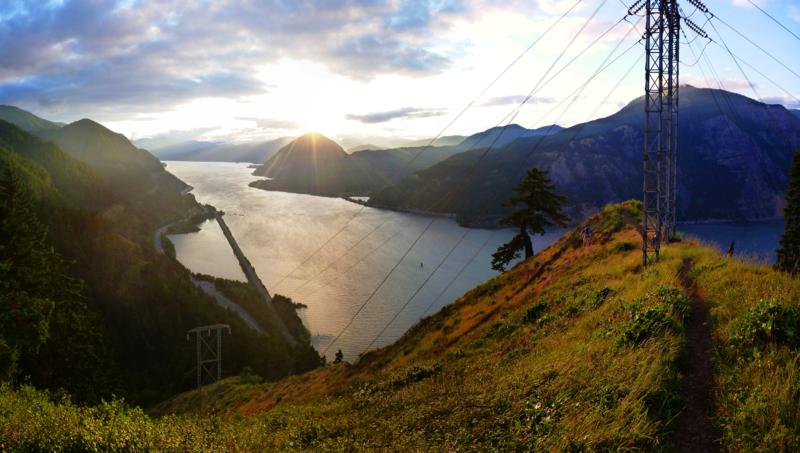
- Starvation Ridge overlooking the Columbia River from the Mark O. Hatfield Memorial Trail
- Length: 60 mi (97 km)
- Location: Columbia River Gorge, Oregon, United States
- Trailheads: Multnomah Falls; Starvation Creek
- Use: Hiking
- Elevation gain/loss: 12,470 feet (3,800 m) gain approximately
- Season: Summer to early fall
- Months: Mid-July through late September

The Mark O. Hatfield Memorial Trail is a proposed long-distance trail through the Columbia River Gorge in Multnomah County and Hood River County, Oregon. The trail will be approximately 60 miles (97 kilometres), although the trail is still unofficial and its exact course is yet to be determined. The trail was first proposed by Tom Kloster on June 20, 2010, and suggests the Mark O. Hatfield Memorial Trail use existing trails from Multnomah Falls to Starvation Creek. Prior to this suggestion, the Talapus Trail, connecting the Pacific Crest Trail and Larch Mountain was slated for construction in 1974. Hikers openly used trails in the Bull Run Watershed into the 1980s, including the Talapus Trail (never officially constructed).

== Sights ==
The Mark O. Hatfield Memorial Trail features several waterfalls, forested land, mountains and valleys. Views from the trail include larger volcanoes in the Cascade Range including Mount Hood, Mount Adams, Mount St. Helens, and Mount Rainier. The trail runs along the southern valleys and peaks on the Oregon side of the Columbia River. At times the river is visible during travel on the trail. Common vegetation seen on the trail includes Douglas-fir, western hemlock, vine maple, and large cedar tree. The trail is in old-growth for only short sections, as logging and the Yacolt Burn of 1902 destroyed much of the forest.

== The Bull Run problem ==
Because the United States Forest Service has not made the Mark O. Hatfield Memorial Trail an official trail yet, and because some proponents of the trail would rather see it run past some remote landmarks such as Mt. Talapus, Eagle Butte, and Table Mountain, the exact course of the trail is still undetermined. All of these landmarks lie within the Bull Run Watershed, which is closed to the public under Public Law 95-200 (PL 95-200 or Bull Run Act). An alternate route, which avoids the Bull Run Watershed boundary, is currently used by hikers, although they do not have the opportunity to see some of the aforementioned places deep in the Columbia River Gorge when hiking this route. Some hiking is legal in the Bull Run Watershed Management Unit, "including 8.3 miles (13.4 km) of the Pacific Crest Trail, 1.3 miles (2.1 km) of the Huckleberry Trail, and 1.4 miles (2.3 km) of the Oneonta Creek Trail," according to Oregon Health Authority's report on drinking water from 2011. This includes some usage by pack animals. The Mark O. Hatfield Memorial Trail would share some of the Pacific Crest Trail through the Bull Run Watershed and use some decommissioned roads (both in and out of the watershed). As of July 16, 2012, The Bull Run Watershed Management Unit, the Forest Service, nor the Portland Water Bureau have allowed for hikers to use any of the sections of the Bull Run Watershed, holding up an official version of the trail.

On August 1, 2012, the Oregonian newspaper reported that the Portland Police Bureau were loaning FLIR surveillance equipment to the Clackamas County Sheriff's Office for the purpose of detecting people in the Bull Run Watershed. Portland City Council would need to vote on the issue of allowing additional hiking trails to be used in the watershed, but no vote is on the docket so far.

== Trail name and signage ==
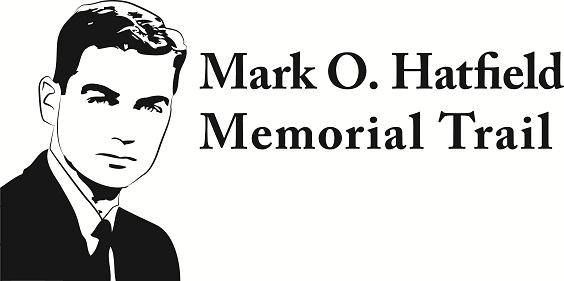
Proposed trail sign

The Mark O. Hatfield Memorial Trail has some controversy around its name. The name comes from former Senator Mark Hatfield, a key figure in conserving the wilderness through which the proposed trail runs. Some feel the name of the trail should not reflect the name of a politician or have issues with Mark O. Hatfield's legacy.

Another issue up for debate is what the signage will look like on the Mark O. Hatfield Memorial Trail. The trail has no signs at all and hikers and backpackers must follow signs for over 15 trails and roads in order to hike the trail in its entirety.

== See also ==
- Pacific Crest Trail
- Timberline Trail
