= Yacolt Burn =

Group of wildfires (1902)

Coordinates: 45°50′N 122°10′W

- Date: September 8–12, 1902
- Location: Southwest Washington and part of Oregon, United States

Statistics
- Burned area: 238,920 acres (96,690 ha)
- Land use: Forest and residential

Impacts
- Deaths: At least 65
- Injuries: Unknown
- Cost: Unknown

Ignition
- Cause: Man made

Map
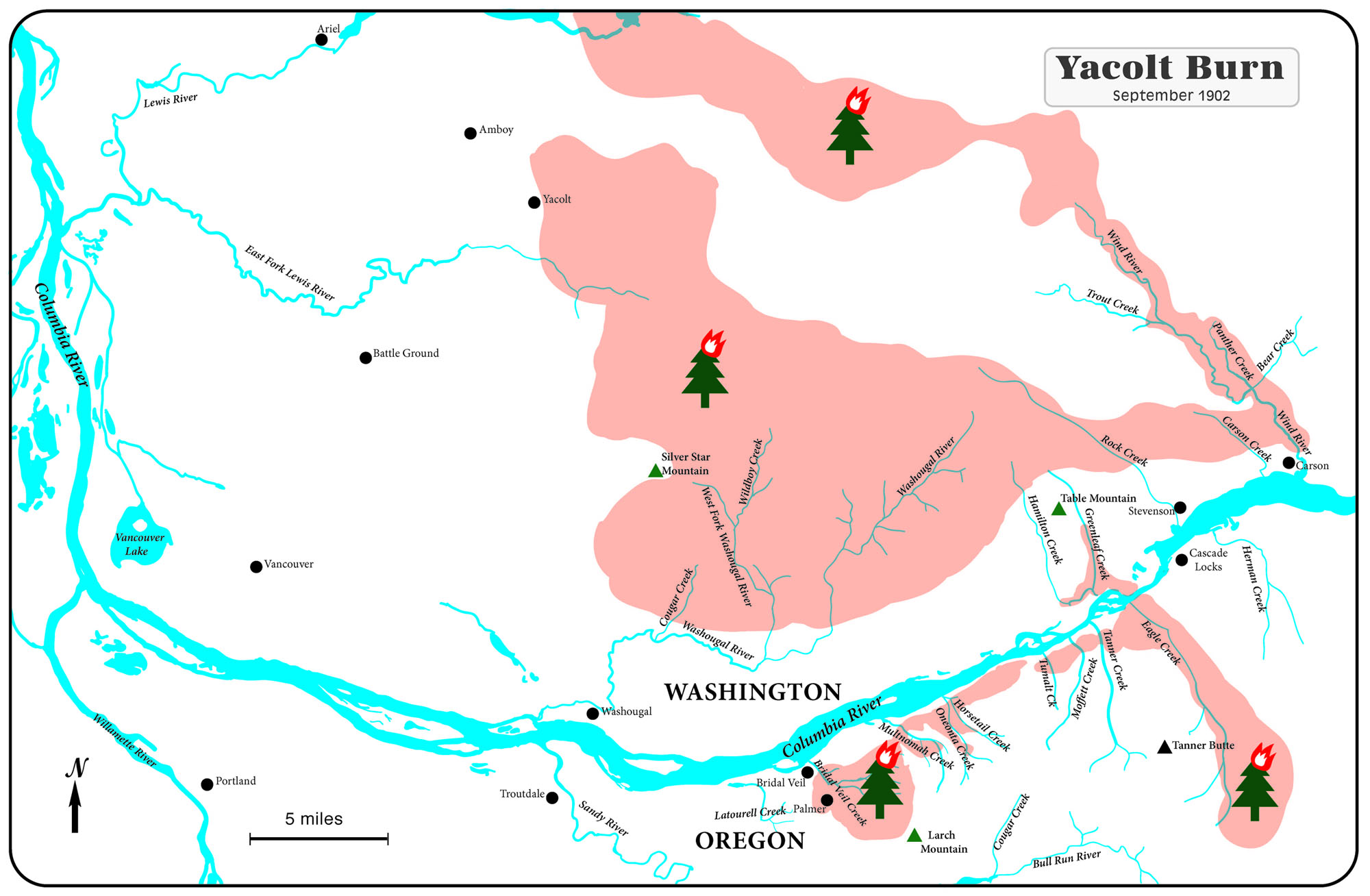
- Southwest Washington showing burned area in pink

The Yacolt Burn is the collective name for dozens of fires in Washington state and Oregon occurring between September 8 and September 12, 1902, causing 38 deaths in the Lewis River area, at least nine deaths by fire in Wind River and 18 deaths in the Columbia River Gorge.

== Origins of the fires ==
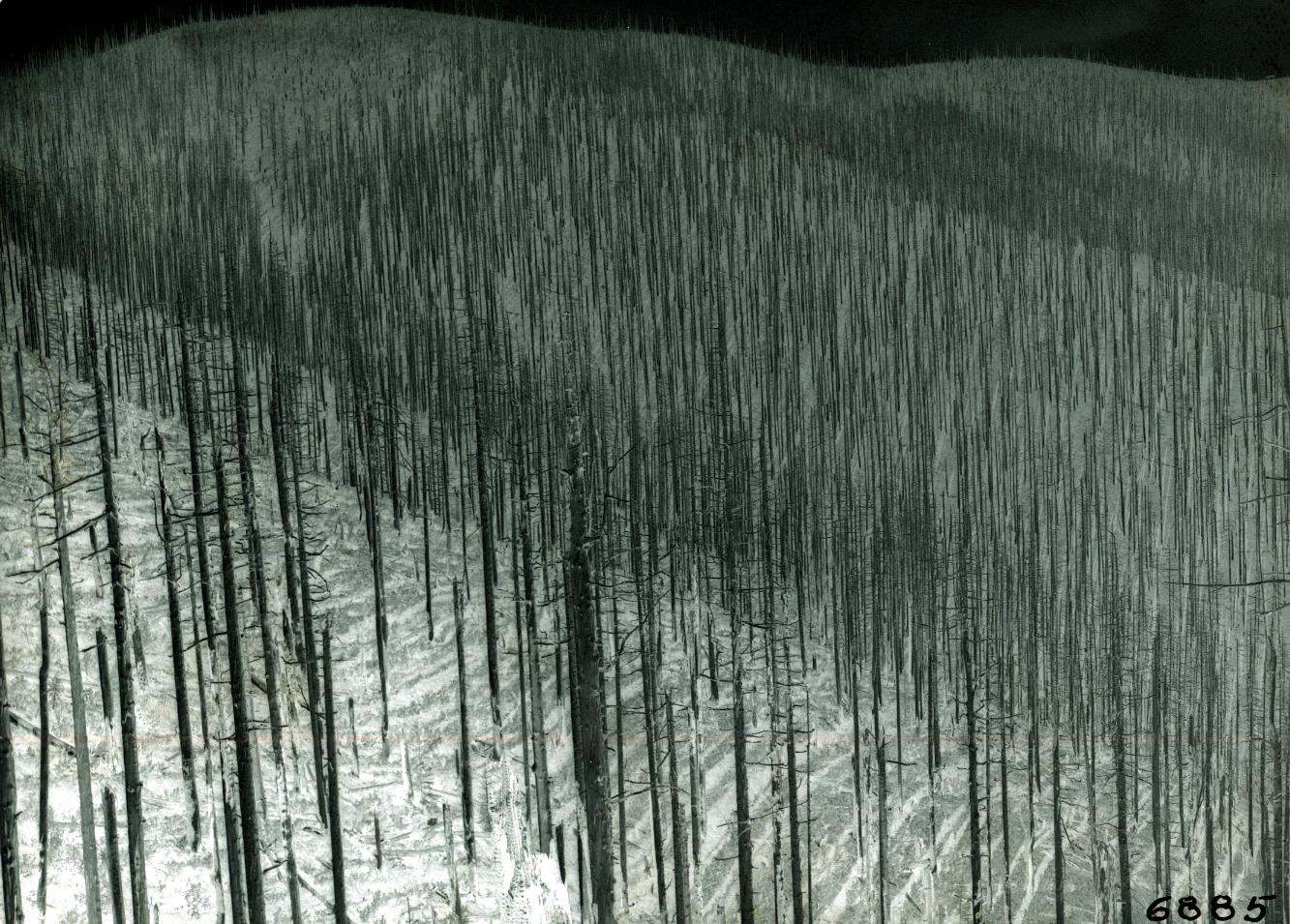
A stand of dead Douglas fir photographed in 1934

The Yacolt Burn (also known as the Yacolt Fire, the Yacolt Blaze, the Yacolt-Cispus Burn, or the Columbia Fire of 1902) was the result of many weather factors as well as careless humans. The summer of 1902 had been drier than normal and early September winds were blowing from east to west. A build-up of slash from loggers had not been burned off properly in the preceding two summers. On September 8 a fire was started by boys trying to burn a nest of hornets near Eagle Creek, Oregon. Other large fires there occurred independently or combined with other fires started soon thereafter, including one started by a locomotive in Dodson, Oregon. Other accounts cite lightning as the genesis of the fire as well as careless campers and berry pickers, hunters, and loggers cutting slash. The fire spread rapidly, extending from Bridal Veil, Oregon to Cascade Locks, Oregon before burning debris carried across the Columbia River to Washington. The fire traveled 30 miles (48 km) in 36 hours and destroyed 238,920 acres (967 km^{2}) of timber, about 12 billion board feet (28,000,000 m^{3}), in Clark, Cowlitz and Skamania counties.

== Extent of damage ==
Although the fire's namesake is for the town of Yacolt, Washington, that town suffered little damage from the fires. The loss of all property was assessed at a 1902 value of US$12,767,100 (equivalent to $475,083,433 in 2025). The property damage in Multnomah County, Oregon was estimated at more than one million dollars.

The fire dropped one-half inch of ash in Portland, Oregon. The smoke was so dense that street lights glowed at noon in Seattle 160 miles (258 km) away and ships on the Columbia River were forced to navigate only by compass. Yacolt, Washington was approached by the inferno close enough to blister paint on the town's 15 buildings, but the wind changed, causing the fire to veer north toward the Lewis River, where it burned itself out. At this point an estimated total of 500,000 acres of forest burned in the fire.

The timber industry on the Columbia River garnered 13,590,599 board feet of shipments in October, 1902, setting a new record for production in a single month.

== Legislation: Yacolt Burn Rules ==
Immediate calls for legislation were put into action in Oregon and Washington in order to prevent fires of this scale from breaking out again. Some bills were passed into law, but they were not effective measures. In 1929, the Dole Valley fire destroyed another 153,000 acres (620 km^{2}) of timber, and in September 2017 the Eagle Creek Fire burned nearly 50,000 acres (200 km^{2}) in the Columbia River Gorge. The propensity for the forested uplands in this area to be repeatedly burned is due to the presence of the Columbia River Gorge, which slices through the Cascade Mountains at nearly sea level and makes the climate of the Portland Metropolitan Area relatively immoderate compared to that of Seattle. The area's wet winters cause rapid growth of lush timber, but this is followed by the intrusion of hot, dry weather in the summer from the arid Cascade Mountain rainshadow. As a result, all logging and other commercial activity in the area is regulated by very restrictive "Yacolt Burn Rules."

== See also ==
- Great Fire of 1910
- Larch Mountain (Clark County, Washington)
- Silver Star Mountain
- Yacolt Burn State Forest

== Sources ==
- Washington State Department of Natural Resources. Yacolt Burn State Forest Map (notes on reverse), 1991
