= Multnomah Falls =

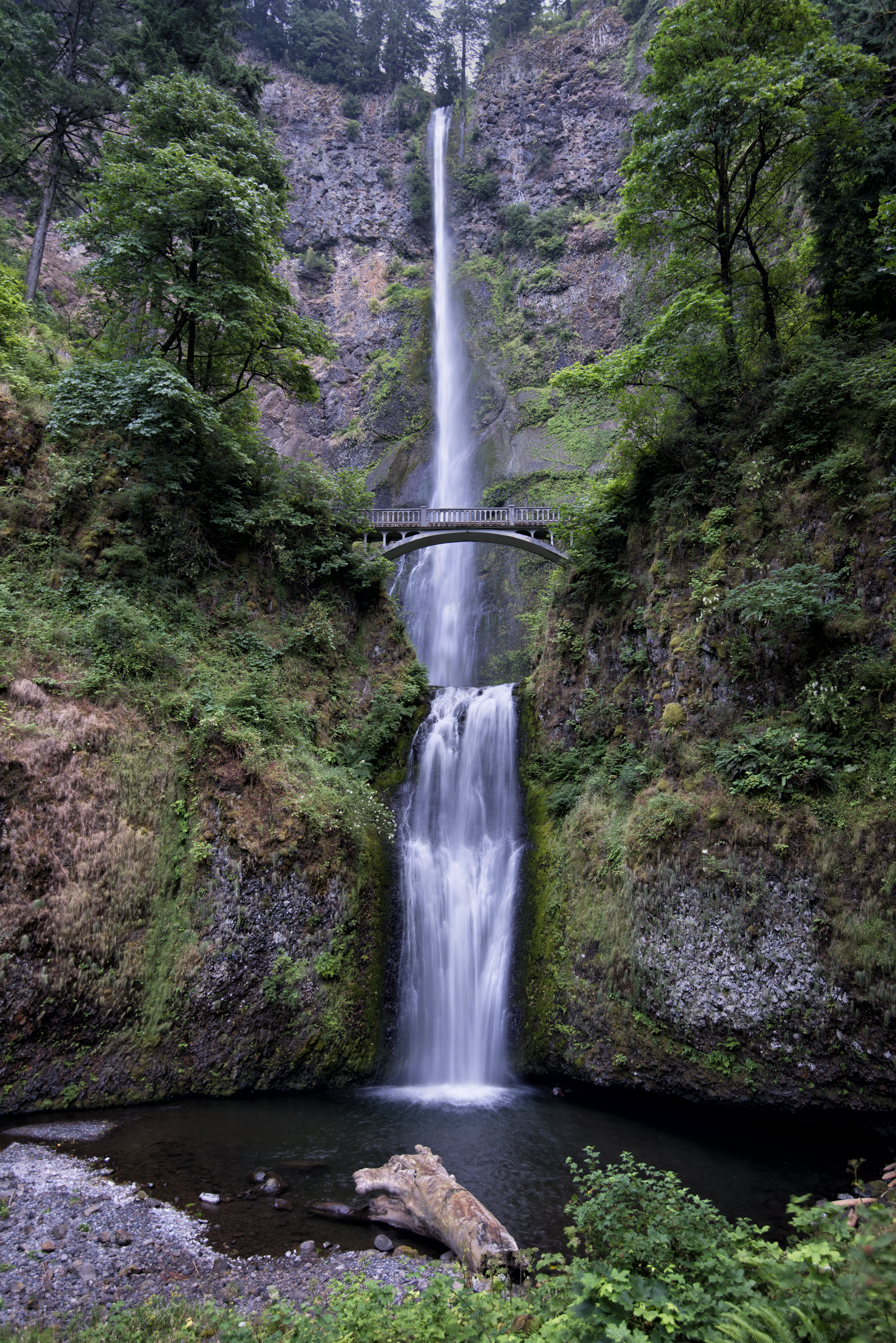
- Full view of both tiers of the falls
- Interactive map of Multnomah Falls
- Location: Columbia River Gorge, Multnomah County, Oregon, U.S.
- Coordinates: 45.57595°N 122.11536°W
- Type: Tiered
- Elevation: 627 ft (191 m)
- Total height: 620 ft (189 m)
- Number of drops: 2
- Longest drop: 542 ft (165 m)
- Average width: 10 ft (3 m)
- Watercourse: Multnomah Creek
- Average flow rate: 150 cu ft/s (4.2 m^{3}/s)
- World height ranking: 434

Multnomah Falls is a waterfall located on Multnomah Creek in the Columbia River Gorge, east of Troutdale, between Corbett and Dodson, Oregon, United States. The waterfall is accessible from the Historic Columbia River Highway and Interstate 84. Spanning two tiers on basalt cliffs, it is the tallest waterfall in the state of Oregon at 620 ft (189 m) in height. The Multnomah Creek Bridge, built in 1914, crosses below the falls, and is listed on the National Register of Historic Places.

The land surrounding the falls was developed by Simon Benson in the early-twentieth century, with a pathway, viewing bridge, and adjacent lodge being constructed in 1925. The Multnomah Falls Lodge and the surrounding footpaths at the falls were added to the National Register of Historic Places in 1981. Contemporarily, the state of Oregon maintains a switchback trail that ascends to a talus slope 100 feet (30 m) above the falls, and descends to an observation deck that overlooks the falls' edge. The falls attract over two million visitors each year, making it the most-visited natural recreation site in the U.S. Pacific Northwest.

== Structure ==
The falls drops in two major steps, split into an upper falls of 542 feet (165 m) and a lower falls of 69 feet (21 m), with a gradual 9 foot (3 m) drop in elevation between the two, so the total height of the waterfall is conventionally given as 620 feet (189 m). The two drops are due to a zone of more easily eroded basalt at the base of the upper falls.

=== Height ===
Multnomah Falls is the tallest waterfall in the state of Oregon. It is credited by a sign at the site of the falls, and by the United States Forest Service, as the second tallest year-round waterfall in the United States. However, there has been some skepticism surrounding this distinction, as Multnomah Falls is listed as the 156th tallest waterfall in the United States by the World Waterfall Database (this site does not distinguish between seasonal and year-round waterfalls). The World Waterfall Database disputes claims that Multnomah Falls is the fourth-tallest waterfall in the United States, which has been claimed in such sources as the Encyclopedia of World Geography (2013).

=== Water source ===
Underground springs from Larch Mountain are the year-round source of water for the waterfall, augmented by spring runoff from the mountain's snowpack and rainwater during the other seasons. This spring is the source of Multnomah Creek.

=== Benson Lake ===
Multnomah Creek drains into Benson Lake approximately 1,300 feet west of the bottom of the falls.

== History ==
=== Formation and early history ===
The waterfall formed around 15,000 years ago at the end of a hanging valley, and was created by the Missoula floods. According to the creation story from the Multnomah tribe (from whom the falls take their name), the waterfall was formed after a young woman sacrificed herself to the Great Spirit to save a Multnomah village from a plague by jumping from the cliff, and the Multnomah peoples were saved. After her death, water began to flow from above the cliff, creating the waterfall.

The falls were noted in the journals of explorers William Clark and Meriwether Lewis during their expedition through the Columbia River Gorge in 1805. In an October 30 journal entry, Lewis notes:

... passed Several places where the rocks projected into the river & have the appearance of having separated from the mountains and fallen into the river, small niches are formed in the banks below those projecting rocks which is common in this part of the river, Saw 4 Cascades caused by Small Streams falling from the mountains on the Lard.

The origin of the falls' naming is unclear; scholar Lewis A. McArthur, in Oregon Geographic Names, suggested that S. G. Reed, a prominent mercantile clerk in Portland and native of Massachusetts, may have been the first to apply the name with the idea of popularizing sites along the Columbia River for steamboat excursions.

=== Post-Reconstruction development ===
- Multnomah Falls Lodge and Footpath
- U.S. National Register of Historic Places
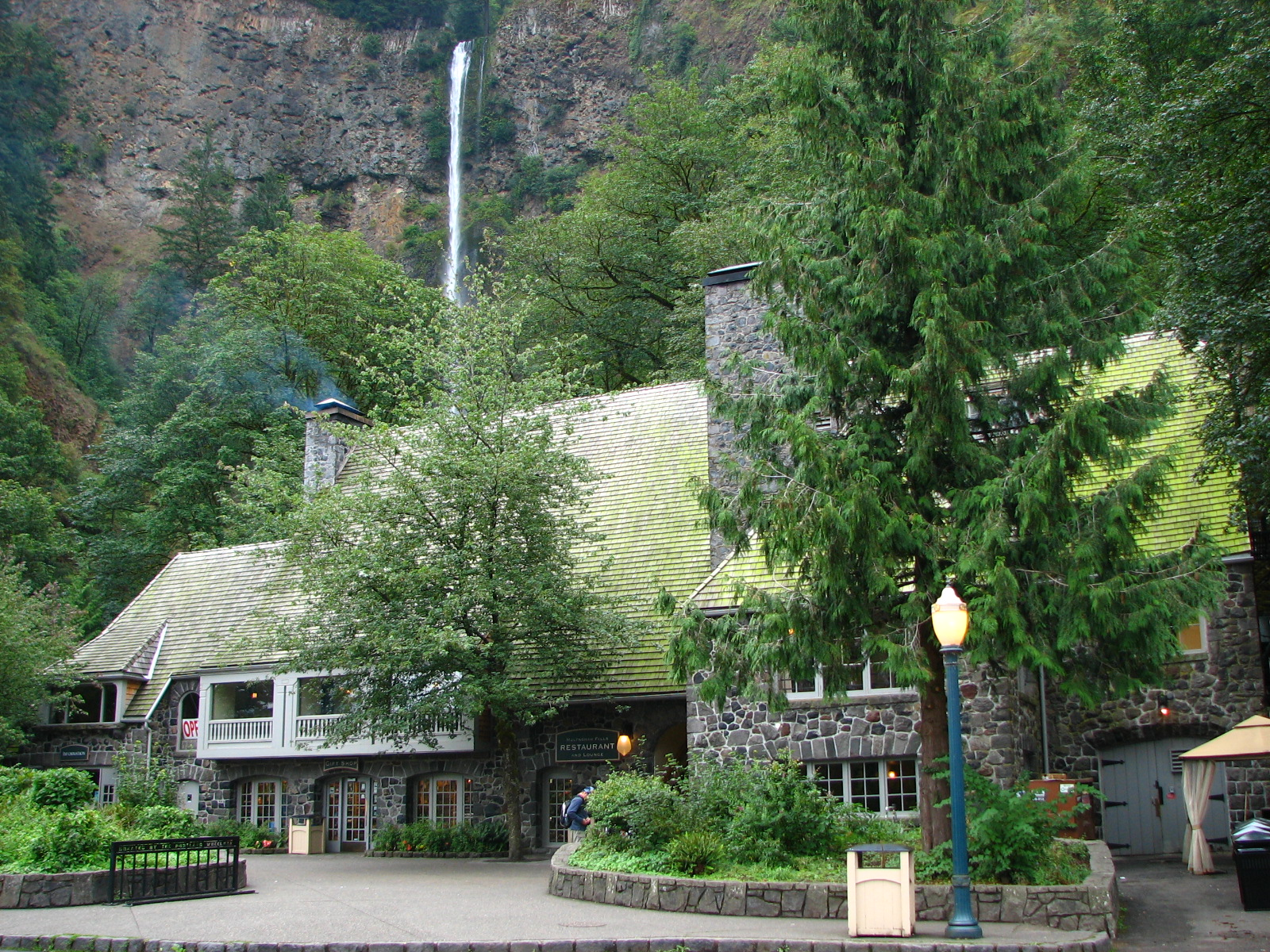
- Location: c. Bridal Veil, Oregon
- Nearest city: Cascade Locks, Oregon
- Coordinates: 45.57595°N 122.11536°W
- Built: 1915
- Architect: A.E. Doyle
- NRHP reference No.: 81000512
- Added to NRHP: April 22, 1981

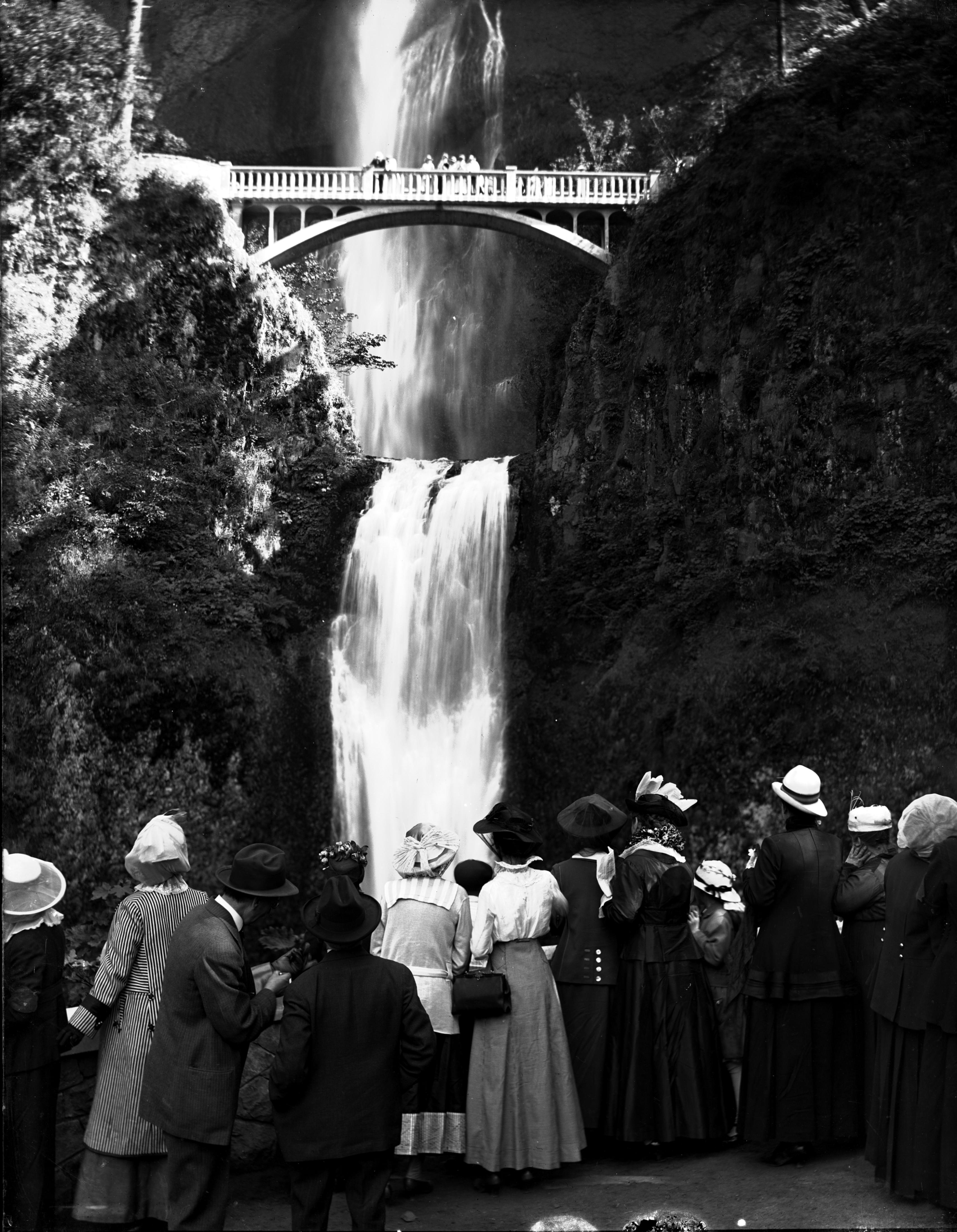
Visitors at the falls c. 1915

Beginning in 1884, the Oregon Railway and Navigation Company operated a stop at Multnomah Falls on their railway, which spanned from Portland to Pasco, Washington; this stop continued to operate until World War II, and included a timber bowstring truss bridge that spanned the falls at the present bridge's location. Around 1891, the bridge was reinforced, but was dismantled in 1899.

On January 28, 1915, Samuel C. Lancaster recommended to the Progressive Business Men's Club of Portland that a trail be built from the base of Multnomah Falls extending to the top of Larch Mountain. The Club raised several hundred dollars to finance the trail, and Portland financier Simon Benson and his son Amos S. Benson pledged an additional $3,000. The United States Forest Service appropriated a total of $1,500 and agreed to survey and build the trail in addition to the lookout on Larch Mountain. Benson financed Italian stonemasons to construct a bridge at the falls to allow visitor access. This bridge, named the Benson Footbridge, spans the lower falls at a height of 105 feet (32 m), and provides an expansive view of the upper falls.

On Labor Day 1915, Benson donated over 1,400 acres (570 ha) of land which included most of the falls as well as nearby Wahkeena Falls, to the city of Portland. The Oregon Railroad and Navigation Company subsequently donated the land at the base of Multnomah Falls contingent upon their agreement that a lodge would be constructed at the site the same year.

Late that year, architect A. E. Doyle, who designed Portland's Meier & Frank Building, was commissioned by the city to design the Multnomah Falls Lodge, which was completed in 1925. The lodge, built in a "Cascadian" architectural style using native split fieldstone laid irregularly. The building features a steeply pitched cedar-shingled gable roof with dormers and large chimneys. In the early through the mid-twentieth century, the lodge provided both meals and lodging to travelers. Contemporarily, it provides meals, a gift shop, and an interpretive center. The lodge and footpaths were added to the National Register of Historic Places in 1981.

== Access ==
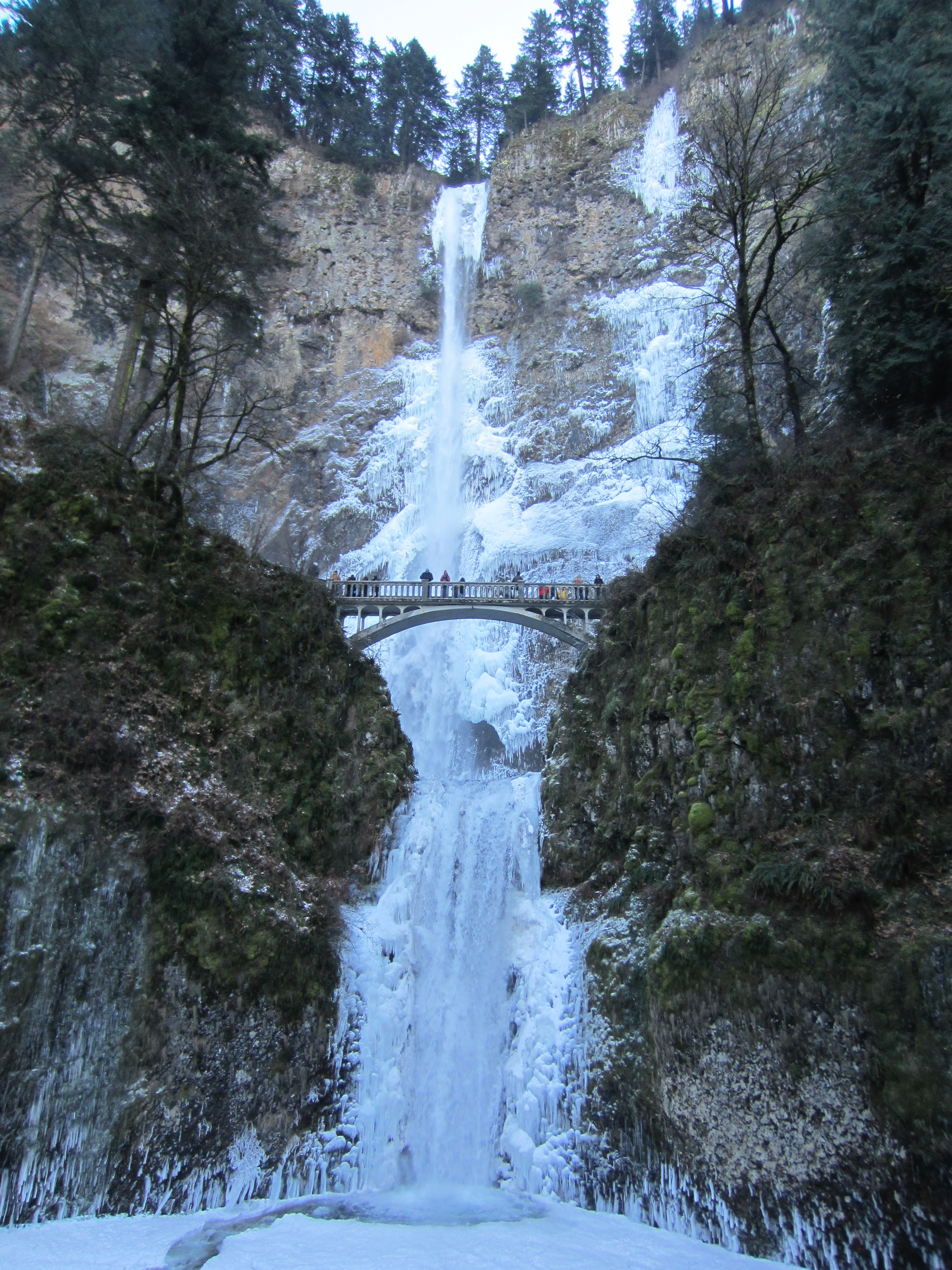
Frozen falls in December

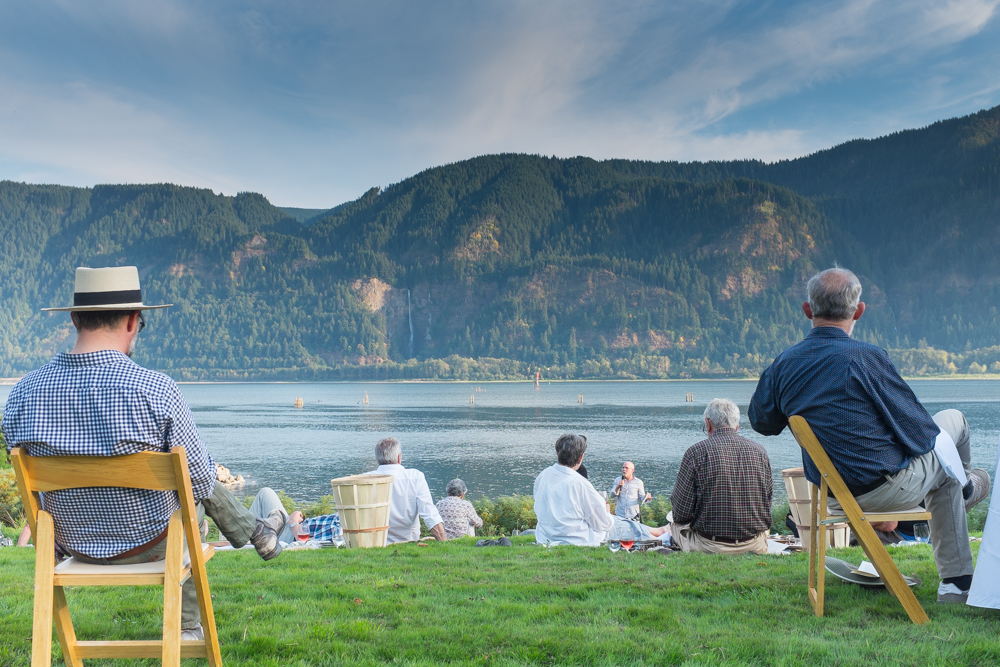
Onlookers on the north bank of the Columbia River in Washington view Multnomah Falls to the south

In contrast to other falls along the Gorge, the Multnomah Falls area is accessible via Interstate 84 east of Troutdale, Oregon, and is a "designated scenic area" by the state of Oregon. The falls are the most-visited natural recreation area in the Pacific Northwest, with over two million annual visitors. The rest area and tunnel under the road (as well as the Union Pacific Railroad tracks) allow Interstate travelers from either direction to stop and visit the falls. Columbia Area Transit operates the Columbia Gorge Express to Portland and Hood River.

During the summer season and holidays the parking lot along the freeway access can fill up very quickly which prompts a gate to come down and a reader board sign along the freeway before the offramp flashes that the parking lot is full.

Several tour providers offer a variety of ways to access Multnomah Falls from ebike rentals to waterfall shuttles that stop at all of the waterfalls near Multnomah Falls

=== Footpaths ===
A paved foot trail leads to Benson Footbridge, a 45-foot (14 m)-long footbridge that allows visitors to cross 105 feet (32 m) above the lower cascade. After a viewpoint of the upper falls, the trail continues to ascend to an elevation of 785 feet (239 m); it consists of eleven switchbacks which reach a forested talus slope 100 feet (30 m) above the falls. The trail then descends to an observation deck (elevation 660 feet (200 m)) overlooking the falls' edge, providing visitors a bird's-eye view of the Columbia Gorge and also of "Little Multnomah", a small cascade slightly upstream from the "upper" falls, which is not visible from ground level.

There are a number of trail junctions along the footpaths ascending to the falls' observation deck, which allow access to a 5.4 miles (8.7 km) trail loop to other nearby waterfalls. The Mark O. Hatfield Memorial Trail, one of several, starts at the falls and continues through the Oregon side of the Columbia River Gorge to Starvation Creek.

== Maintenance concerns ==
In 1991, a wildfire damaged over 1,600 acres (650 ha) near the falls, and resulted in the closing of Perdition Trail, a hiking trail that branched off the main trail to the falls' observation deck. The trail is permanently closed and deemed unsafe for passage.

On Labor Day in September 1995, a 400-ton boulder, loosened by weathering and erosion, fell 225 feet (69 m) from the face of the waterfall into the upper cascade pool, above Benson Footbridge. It caused a 70-foot (21 m) splash of water and gravel to wash over the footbridge, causing minor injuries to twenty members of a wedding party that happened to be on the bridge posing for photos at the time.

On January 9, 2014, a falling rock damaged a portion of the bridge walkway and concrete railing, leading the Forest Service to close the bridge until repairs were completed.

In September 2017, the lodge was threatened by the Eagle Creek Fire in the Columbia River Gorge, which resulted in the lodge and fall access being closed to the public. The lodge reopened on November 29, 2017, though the U.S. Forest Service announced that footpath access to the waterfall would remain closed until an indeterminate date due to concerns over landslides. The trail to the Benson Bridge reopened in June 2018, while the remaining trails along upper Multnomah Creek and to Wahkeena Falls, the top of Larch Mountain, Devil's Rest, and Angel's Rest were repaired and reopened in November 2018.

== Multnomah Creek Bridge ==
A five-ribbed spandrel bridge, the Multnomah Creek Bridge, was built in 1914 to bring what is now the Historic Columbia River Highway across Multnomah Creek below the falls. It is 67 feet (20 m) long and is a contributing structure in the highway's listing on the National Register of Historic Places, and in its designation as a National Historic Landmark.

== Gallery ==
Bridges and landscapes
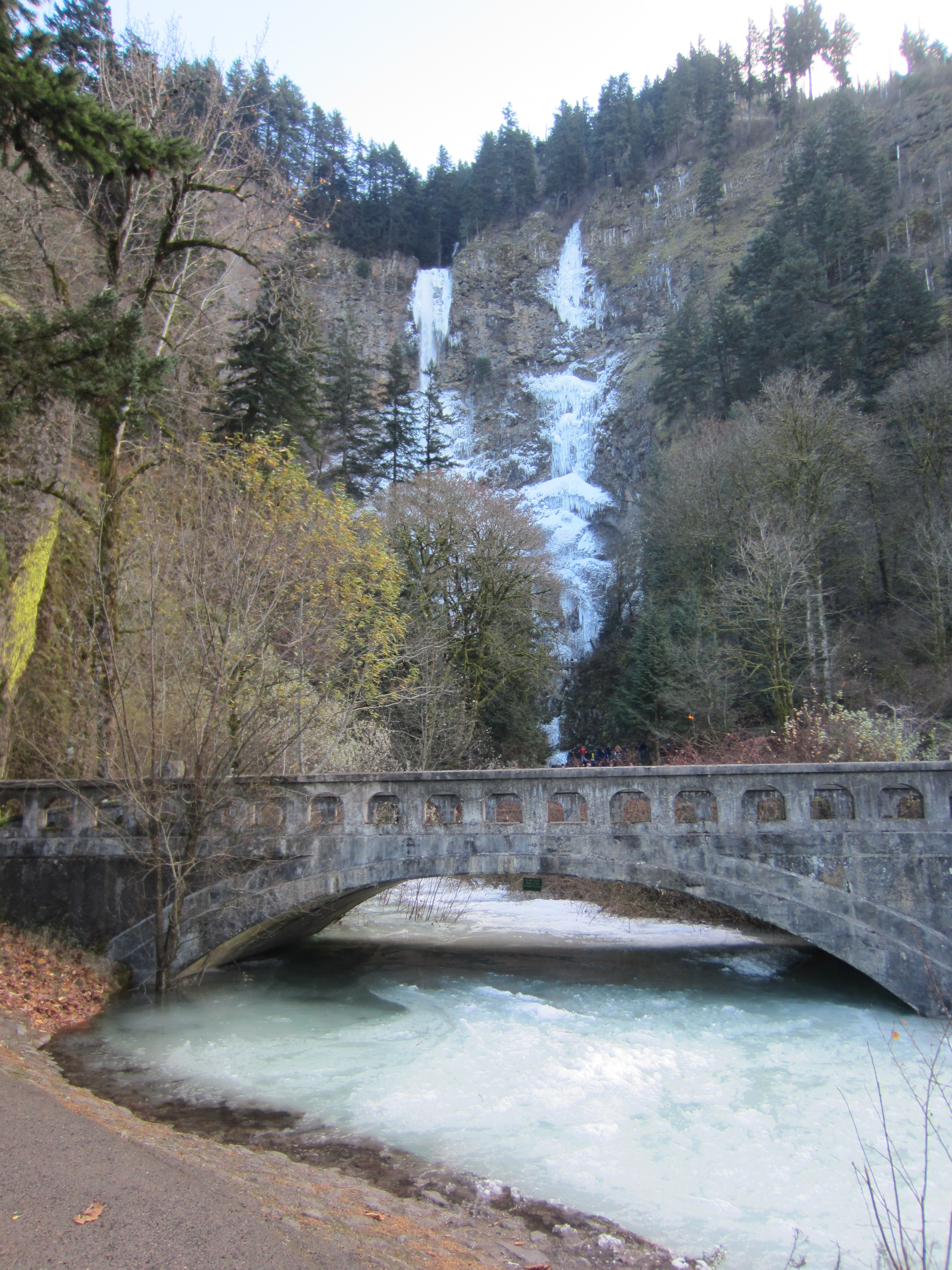
Multnomah Creek Bridge

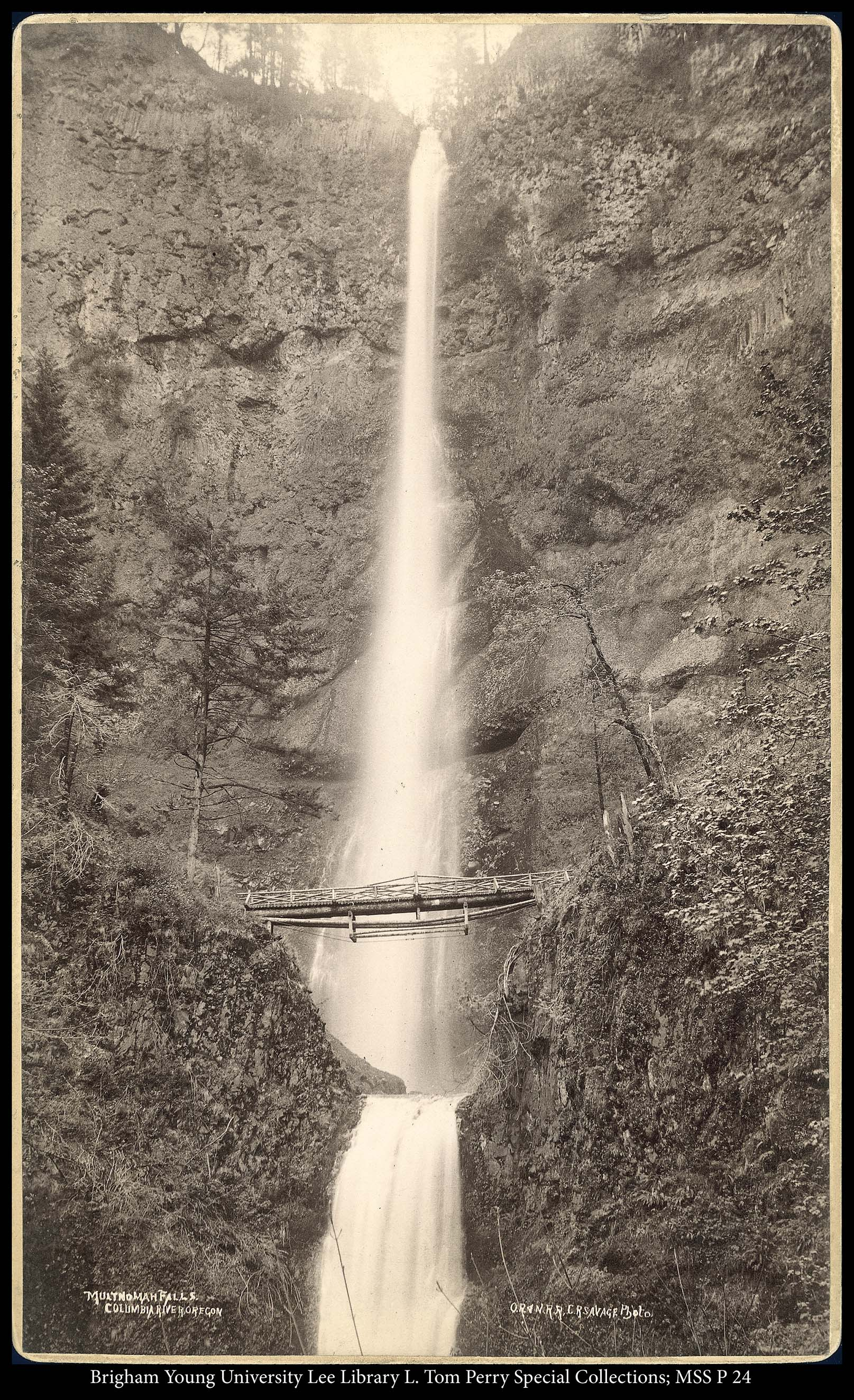
Original timber truss bridge built by the Oregon Railway and Navigation Company, c. 1888

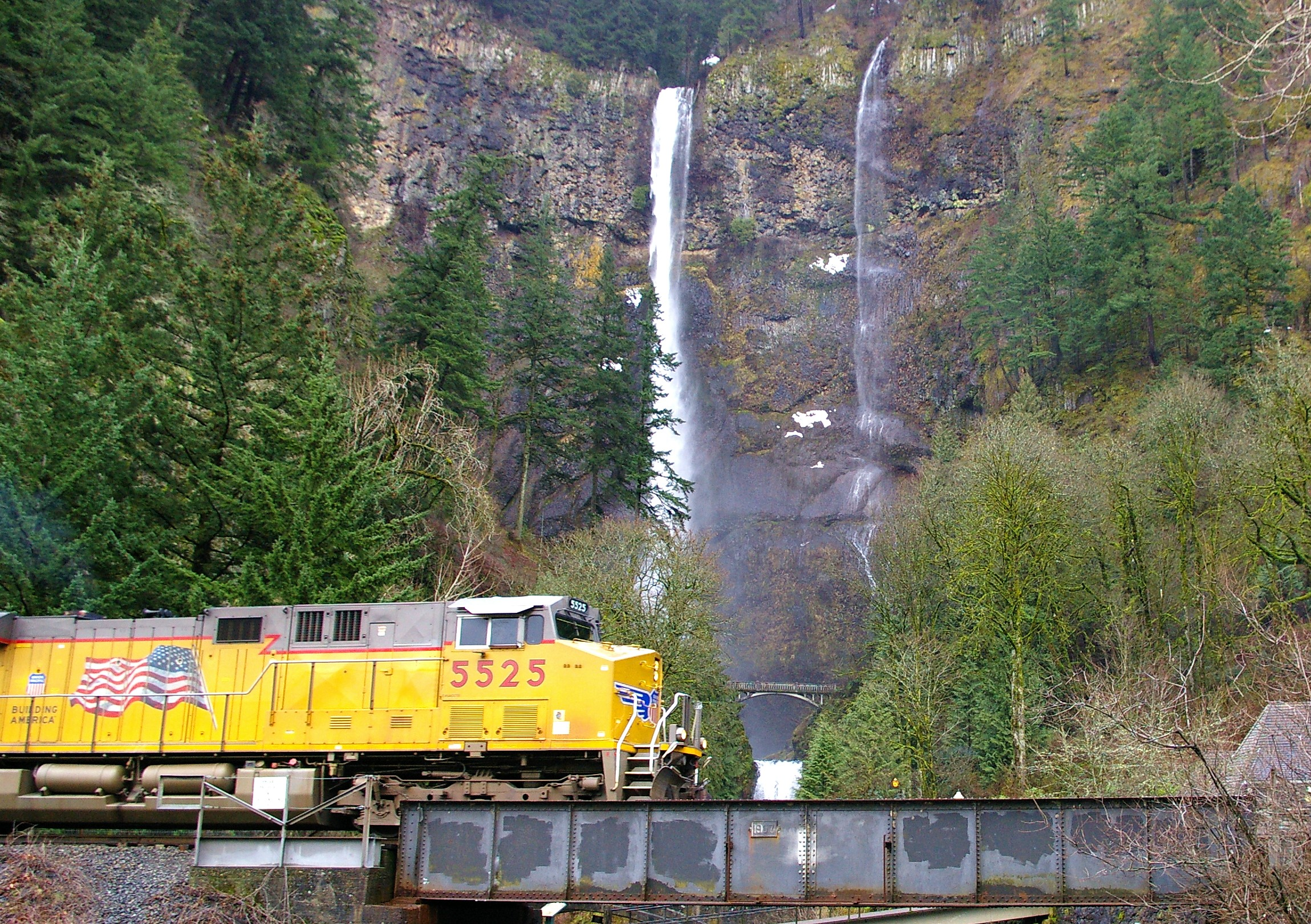
A Union Pacific Railroad locomotive passing the falls

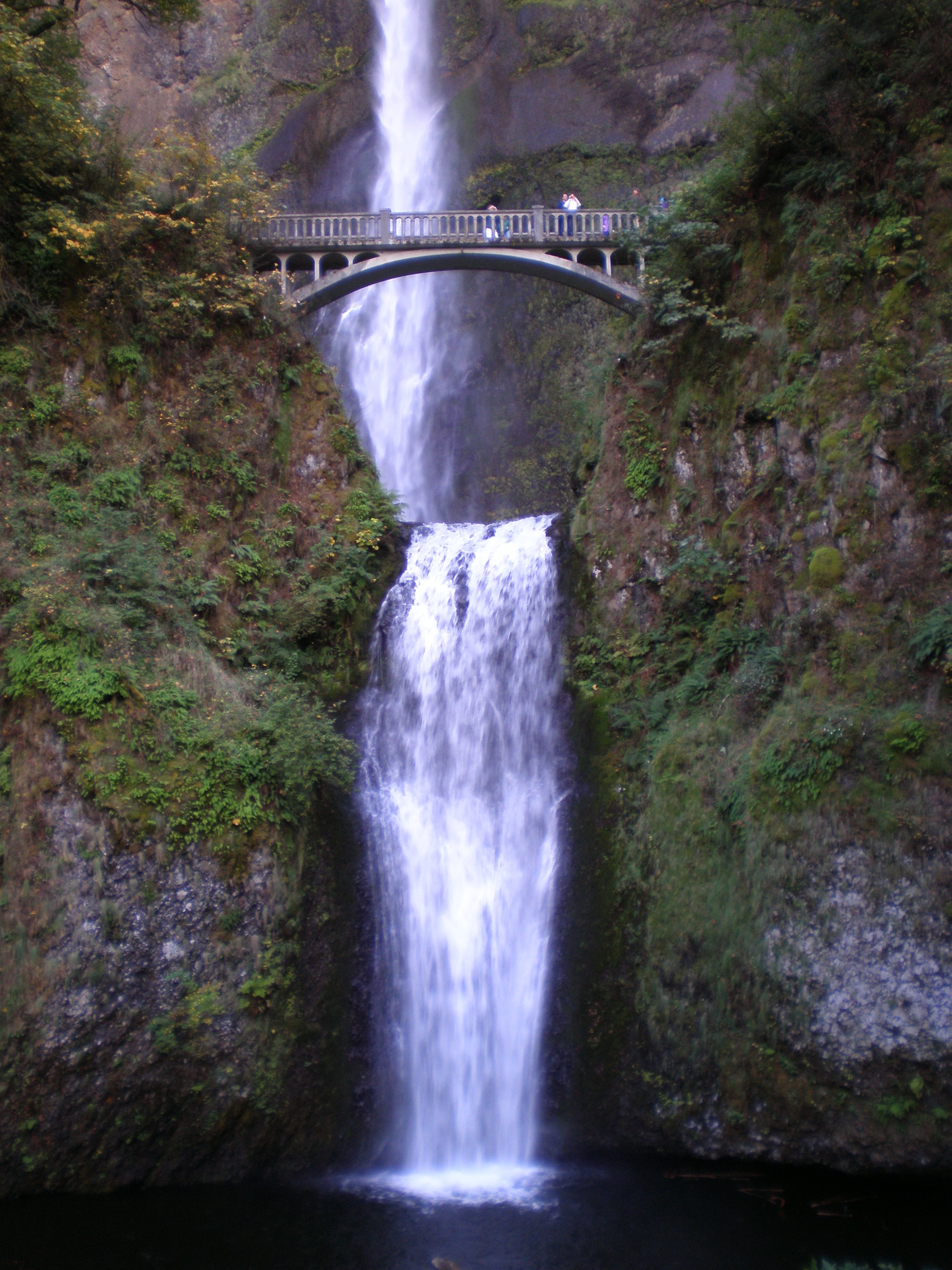
Bridge built over the falls

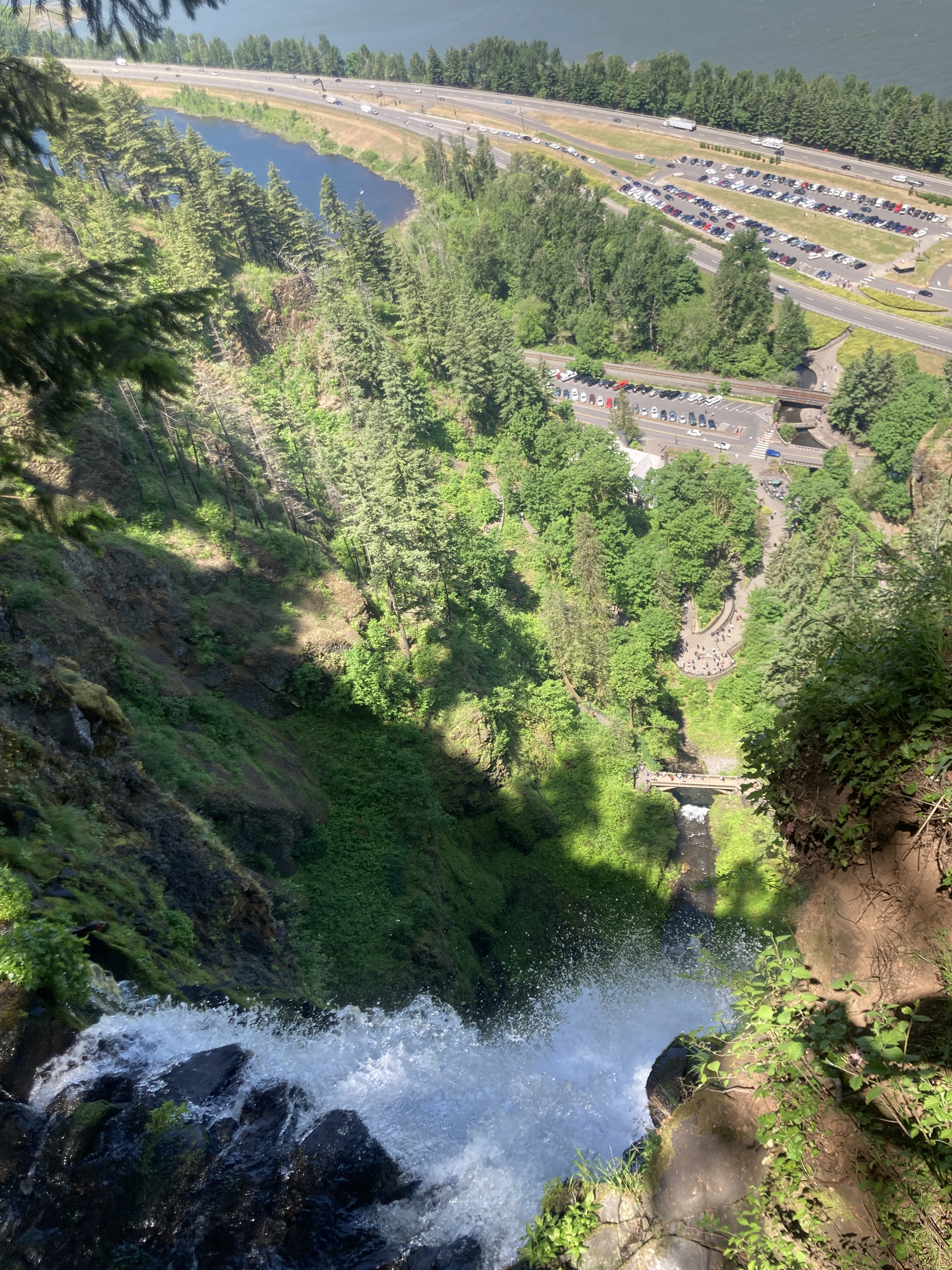
Top of Multnomah Falls with lodge and parking lot visible, along with I-84 and the Columbia River)

== See also ==
- List of bridges documented by the Historic American Engineering Record in Oregon
- List of bridges on the National Register of Historic Places in Oregon
- List of waterfalls
- List of waterfalls in Oregon
- List of waterfalls by type
- Yosemite Falls

== Works cited ==
- Bernstein, Art; Jackman, Andrew (2000). Portland Hikes: Day Hikes in Oregon and Washington Within 100 Miles of Portland. Mountain N' Air Books. ISBN 978-1-879-41532-4.
- Coues, Elliott (1979). The History of the Lewis and Clark Expedition. Vol. 3. Courier Corporation. ISBN 978-0-486-21270-8.
- McColl, R. W. (2014). Encyclopedia of World Geography. Vol. 1. Infobase Publishing. ISBN 978-0-816-07229-3.
- Romano, Craig (2011). Day Hiking Columbia River Gorge: National Scenic Area/Silver Star Scenic Area/Portland--Vancouver to The Dalles. The Mountaineers Books. ISBN 978-1-594-85369-2.
- Roza, Greg (2010). Oregon: Past and Present. The Rosen Publishing Group. ISBN 978-1-448-80035-3.
- Sternberg, Robert J. (1998). Cupid's Arrow: The Course of Love Through Time. Cambridge University Press. ISBN 978-0-521-47893-9.
