= Benson State Recreation Area =

State park in Oregon

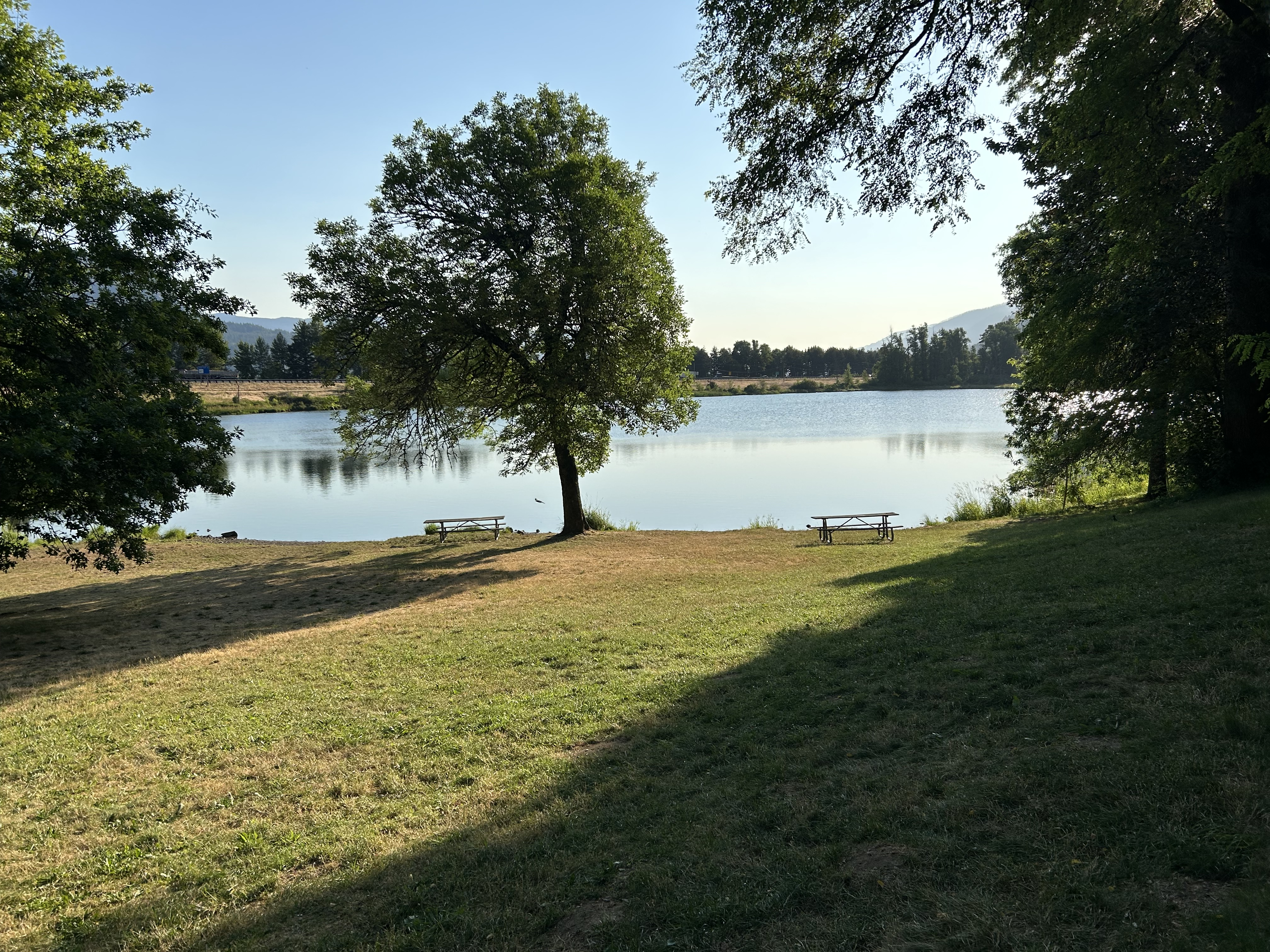
- Benson State Recreation Area in 2024

- Location within Oregon Location within the United States
- Type: Public, state
- Location: Multnomah County, Oregon
- Nearest city: Troutdale
- Coordinates: 45°34′44″N 122°07′32″W
- Etymology: Simon Benson
- Operator: Oregon Parks and Recreation Department

Benson State Recreation Area is a state park in the U.S. state of Oregon, administered by the Oregon Parks and Recreation Department.

The Recreation Area contains a disc golf course and picnic area and is home to Benson Lake and Hartman Pond, which are open to non-motorized personal boats, swimming, and fishing.

Benson State Recreation Area as well as Benson Lake are named for Portland businessman and philanthropist Simon Benson. Hartman Pond is named for Bud Hartman, a prominent local fisherman and officer of the Oregon Bass and Panfish Club. Benson Lake is the body of water that Multnomah Falls drains into.

== History ==
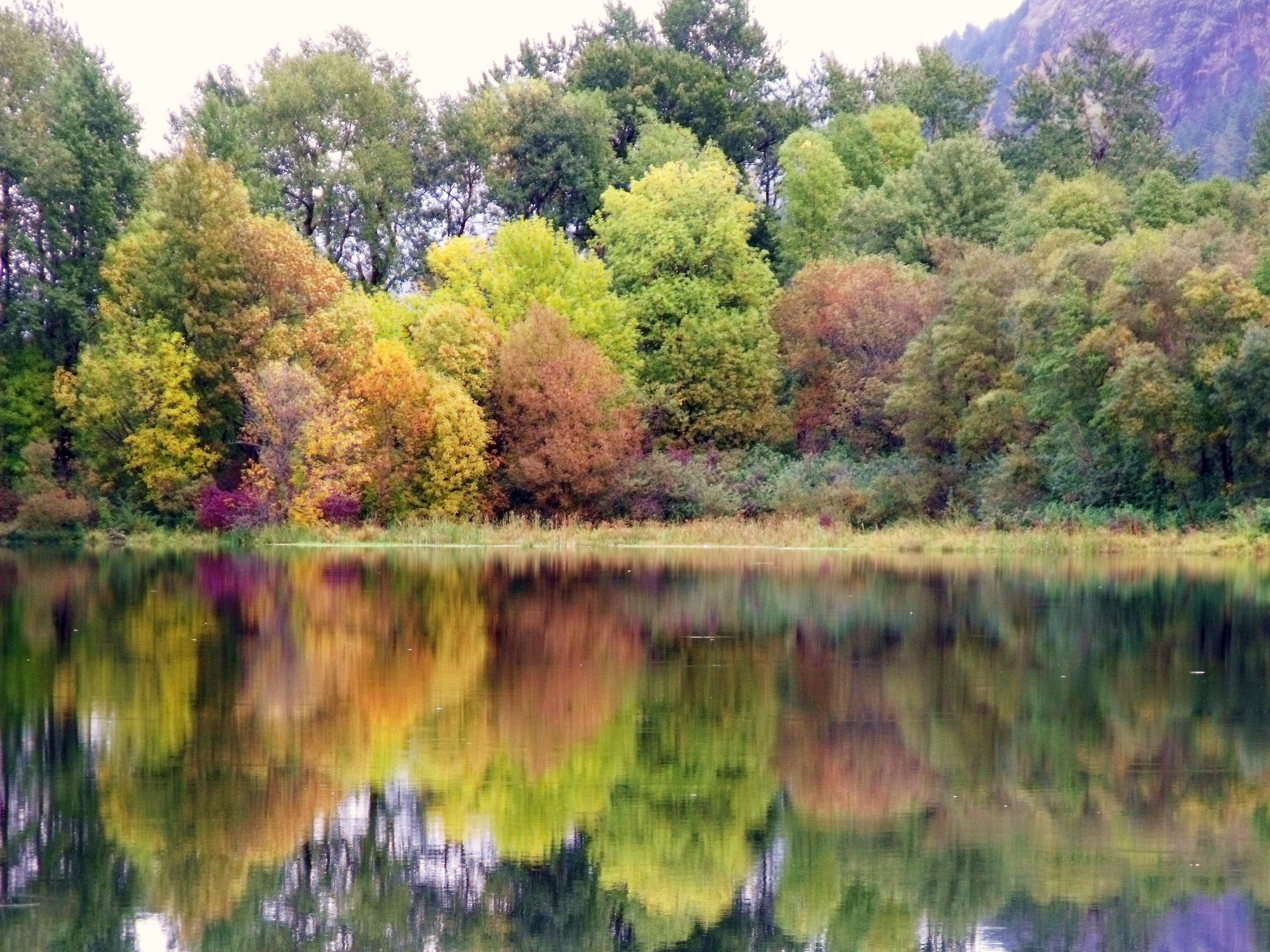
Benson Lake in 2009

The Park was founded in 1915 by the City of Portland as Benson Park. It was named for Portland businessman and philanthropist Simon Benson, one of the primary proponents of the nearby Historic Columbia River Highway, who donated the land.

In 1933, the city granted permission to the Federal Government to build a Civilian Conservation Corps camp, known as CCC Camp Benson. From 1933 to 1935, CCC members remodeled the park, creating New Benson Park. In 1939, the City of Portland donated the park to the United States Forest Service who transferred control to the Oregon Parks and Recreation Department (commonly referred to as Oregon State Parks), when it became known as Benson State Recreation Area. From 1939 to 1977, the park was expanded by additional land donations primarily from the Lenske Family and Multnomah County, as well as a significant purchase by the State Highway Division on behalf of Oregon State Parks.

== See also ==
- List of Oregon state parks
