= Wiesendanger Falls =

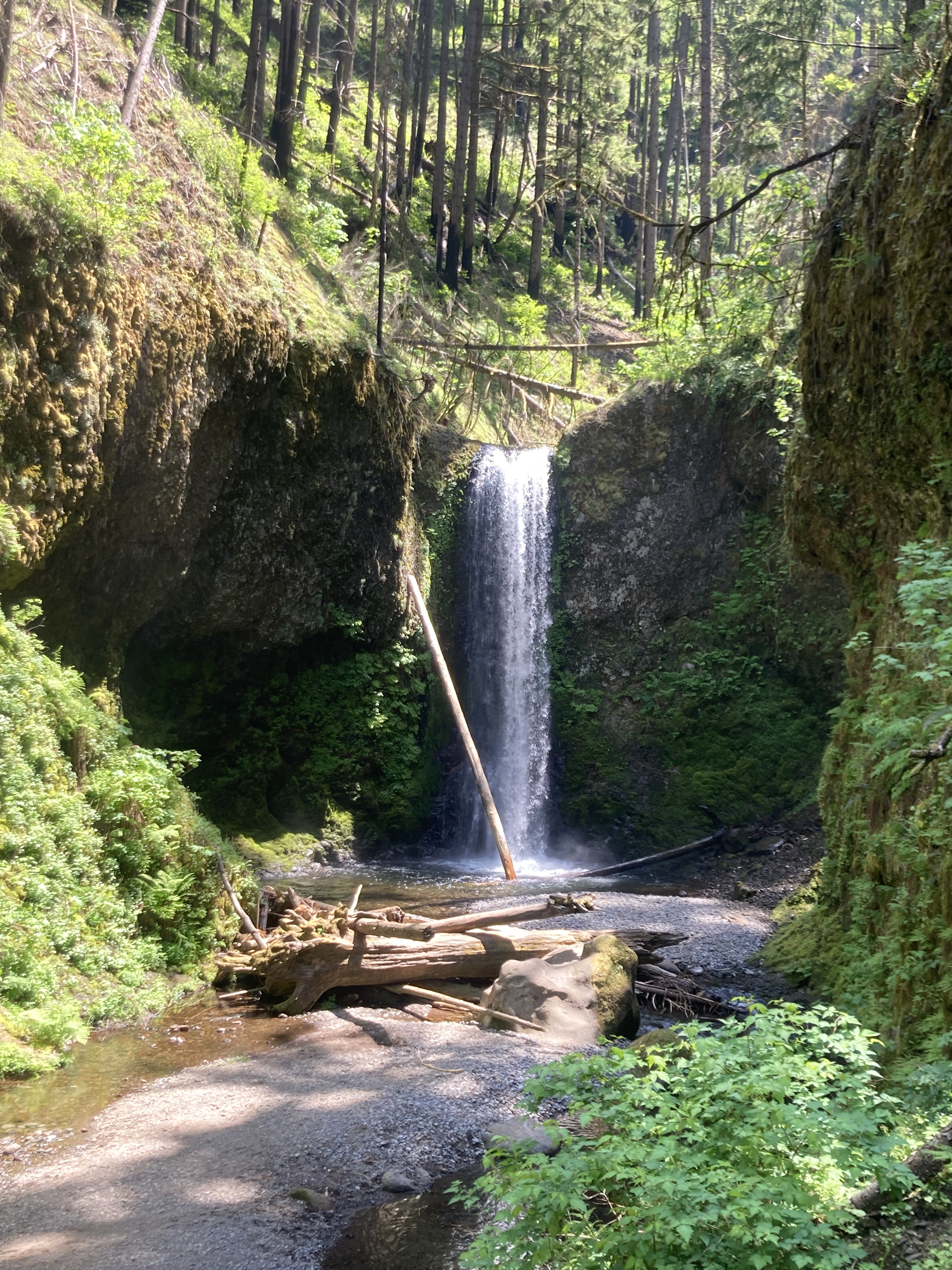
- Interactive map of Wiesendanger Falls
- Location: Columbia River Gorge
- Coordinates: 45.57444°N 122.10778°W
- Type: Plunge
- Elevation: 969 ft (295 m)
- Total height: 50 ft (15 m)
- Average flow rate: 150 cu ft/s (4.2 m^{3}/s)

Wiesendanger Falls, also known as Double Falls and Twanklaskie Falls, is a 50-foot waterfall on the Columbia River Gorge, Multnomah County, Oregon, United States. Its main drop is 50 feet and is located upstream of Multnomah Falls and accessed through the Multnomah-Wahkeena Loop Hike.

== History ==
The name of the waterfall is from Albert Wiesendanger, a notable USDA Forest Service worker in the first half of the 20th century. The name is spelled "Wiesendanger" on a commemorating plaque on the trail to the waterfall, with the "i" before the "e". Other sources spell the vowels in reverse, the "e" before the "i".

== See also ==
- List of waterfalls in Oregon
