= Silver Star Mountain (Skamania County, Washington) =

Mountain in Washington, United States

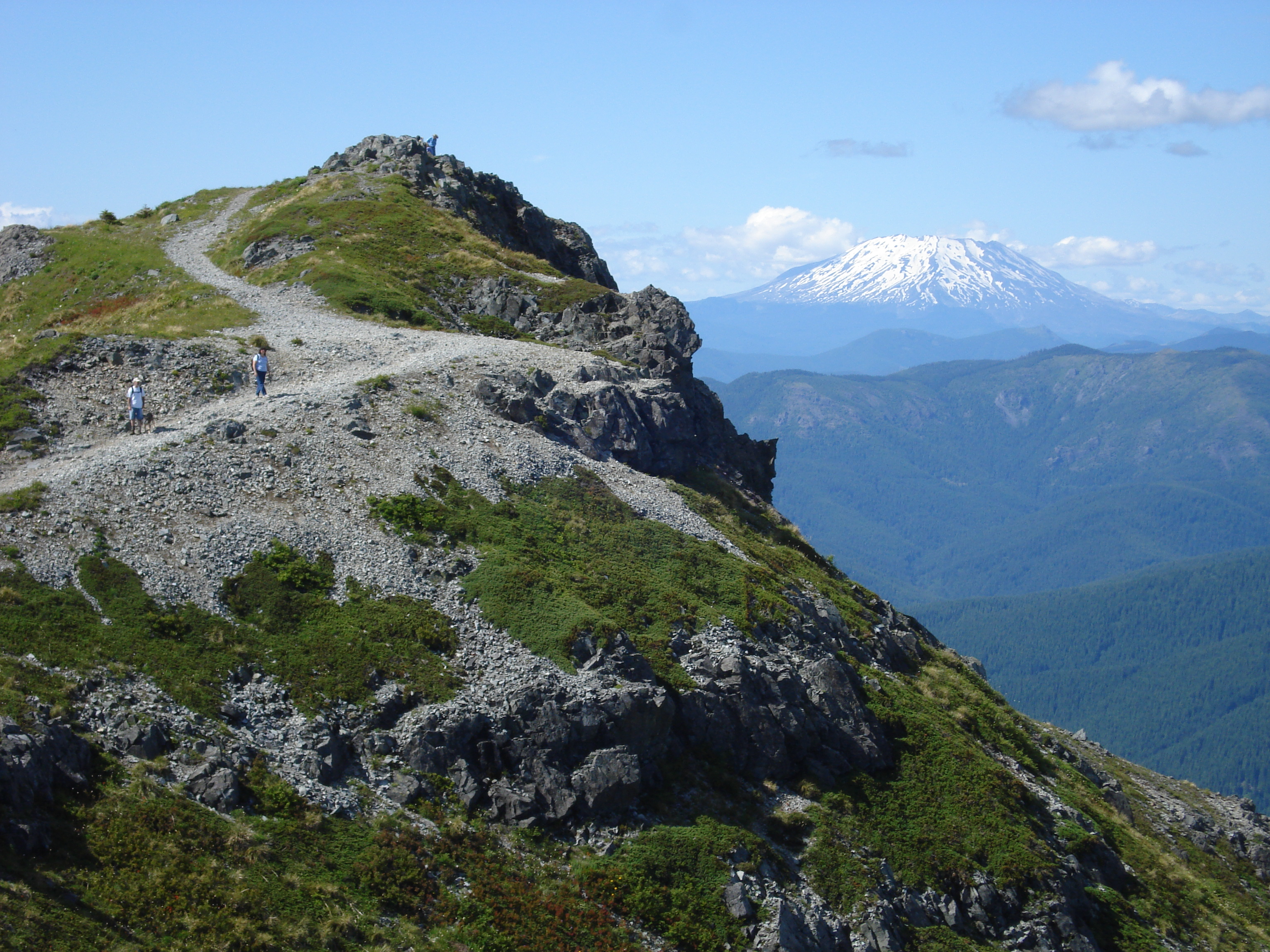
- Summit of Silver Star with Mount St. Helens in the background

Highest point
- Elevation: 4,364 ft (1,330 m) NAVD 88
- Coordinates: 45°44′51.8″N 122°14′20.5″W

Geography
- Location: Skamania County, Washington, U.S.
- Parent range: Cascade Range
- Topo map: USGS Bobs Mountain

Geology
- Volcanic arc: Cascade Volcanic Arc

Silver Star Mountain is a recently uplifted ridge of older Western Cascades volcanic rock, underlain by a granitic pluton of similar Western Cascades age, located in the Cascade Range in the U.S. state of Washington. (contrary to local legend, the mountain is not an "extinct volcano," but rather the uplifted debris and roots of a number of very old volcanic vents) Consisting of late Eocene to Oligocene epoch rock, it lies within the Gifford Pinchot National Forest. Silver Star is composed of three lithologic units (distinct units of rock, each with different physical characteristics), including the large Silver Star Granodiorite unit.

Silver Star Mountain and the surrounding area, in contrast to the rest of the local backcountry, has a ridge-like appearance, creating a striking skyline similar to mountains further north in the Cascade Range. The area lacks trees, and comprises steep cliffs, talus slopes, and meadows filled with wildflowers. The mountain can be hiked and has been noted for its trails by locals.

== Geography ==
Silver Star Mountain lies in Skamania County, in the U.S. state of Washington. According to the North American Vertical Datum of 1988, it reaches an elevation of 4,364 feet (1,330 m), though the Geographic Names Information System database lists its elevation at 4,377 feet (1,334 m), and The Columbian gives its height as 4,382 feet (1,336 m). The mountain lies in the western segment of the Middle Cascades. It is about 12 miles (19 km) north of the western end of the Columbia River Gorge and is accessible from United States Forest Service roads connected to county roads and Washington state highways. Silver Star is located in the southwestern corner of the Gifford Pinchot National Forest, which encompasses an area of 1,300,000 acres (5,300 km^{2}) in southwestern Washington state.

The greater Silver Star Mountain area consists of an eroded plateau, largely made up of lava, with an average relief of about 2,000 feet (610 m) and reaching a local maximum elevation of 3,000 feet (910 m). Unlike the rest of the western Cascade backcountry, it has a ridge-like appearance, creating a striking skyline similar to mountains further north in the Cascade Range. The area lacks trees and comprises steep cliffs, talus slopes, and meadows filled with wildflowers.

The locale drains into the Washougal River and the Lewis River's East Fork, which flow to the south and west respectively. Erosion by these rivers has dissected the land, producing a relief of 2,500 to 3,000 feet (760 to 910 m). Precipitation reaches a peak during the winter season, usually deposited as snow that produces drifts, especially in deep canyons in the area. These drifts often remain until the summer, feeding small streams in the vicinity. Surface runoff has increased due to the removal of forest cover by historical fires, including large fires in 1902 and 1929. As a result, run off has eroded gullies on local slopes and increased removal of soil. However, there are talus slopes with heights up to 1,200 feet (370 m), which cover a large percentage of the granodiorite. The granodiorite is not exposed at the summit or along main approach trails. Small cirque-like basins, likely carved out by small glaciers, occur in a few of the larger canyons, with depressions up to 75 feet (23 m) in depth. These often host tarn lakes, and some support snowdrifts.

Soil on and around the mountain has been eroded by repeated fires, including the Yacolt Burn in 1902 and 16 additional fires through 1929. Slow regrowth motivated the Civilian Conservation Corps to plant more trees during the 1930s, and terracing was also used during the 1960s to facilitate better vegetation regrowth.

== Ecology ==
Wildflowers grow at unusually low elevations at Silver Star Mountain, as a result of fires, wind, and rocky subsoil. There are more than 100 types of wildflowers and flowering shrubs on the volcano, such as heather, star tulip, tiger lily, Grey's loveage, hairbell, bear grass, western bistort, columbine, Avalanche lily, broadleaf lupine, wooly sunflower, Cardwell's penstemon, Indian paintbrush, phlox, balsamroot, and glacier lilies. Trails around the mountain, in addition to offering views of wildflower-cover slopes, pass through thickets of huckleberry, as well as forests with noble fir.

== Geology ==
In the area surrounding Silver Star Mountain, rocks forms three discrete lithologic units (characterized by visible physical characteristics or the gross physical character of the rock). The Eagle Creek formation is the oldest, likely dating to the Oligocene epoch (or the lower Miocene). The rock consists mostly of cream-colored, vitric tuffs, which have undergone weathering that has converted them to a yellow or white colored soil, though there are also multicolored tuffs, which vary from red to green and purple breccias. Often their color depends on the extent of inner iron compounds. They display little assortment or bedding, indicating that they likely accumulated subaerially. Rocks from the formation form outcrops on the eastern part of the Silver Star Mountain locale, and are exposed in central parts of the Columbia River Gorge. Other exposures from the Eagle Creek formation can be observed in Silver, Bluebird, and Bear creeks, where they occur in canyons along the eastern part of the locale. The second, younger unit is the Skamania Andesites, which sit atop the Eagle Creek deposits and consist of thick layers of andesite interbedded with minor inclusions of breccia and pyroclastic material. Less exposed than the Eagle Creek deposits, they are often detectable within 5 feet (1.5 m) of the surface, sitting disconformably over the Eagle Creek rock layers as a result of thorough erosion. At other points, including the eastern border of the Silver Star area, they occur between layers of the Eagle Creek tuffs, possibly due to partially overlapping deposition times or the combination of the tuff deposition and andesite extrusion. The Skamania Andesites encompass the largest distribution of the three lithologic formations in the area, forming thin lava flows that suggest extrusion as highly fluid lava. Andesites located higher on the Silver Star Mountain edifice have undergone less erosion than deposits at lower elevations. The age of the Skamania Andesites is not known, though Felts (1939) hypothesized that they were formed during the pre-middle Miocene epoch. They have a gray to green-gray color and are porphyritic, containing smaller amounts of breccia and tuff, as well as phenocrysts with plagioclase, augite, and magnetite. The phenocrysts range from 0.039 to 0.236 inches (1 to 6 mm) in size, with an average diameter of 0.12 inches (3 mm). Sometimes, they contain chlorite or similar minerals. Rocks from the upper third of the Skamania Andesites have a similar composition, but they are more vesicular in texture.

The third unit is called the Silver Star Granodiorite, which is made up of augite diorite and quartz diorite. Dikes with quartz, tourmaline, and sericite occur within the mass, which has a light color aggregated from white to pink plagioclase with orthoclase, clear quartz, and black to green biotite and hornblende crystals. About 10 miles (16 km) in length and ranging from 1.5 to 2.5 miles (2.4 to 4.0 km) in width, the stock (a small pluton) lies along a long axis angled at twenty degrees to the east. It has steep walls which have not been excavated by local canyons that cut into nearby rock. Felts (1939) suggested that the stock intruded at an angle of 20 degrees east of north. The stock cuts through the Eagle Creek formation and the lower two-thirds of the Skamania Andesites, forming contact metamorphic rock and small dikes of granodiorite and aplite into their tuff and andesite deposits. The absence of dikes or intrusions in the upper third of the Skamania Andesites formation suggests a time gap between the extrusion of the lower and upper segments, during which the granodiorite intrusion occurred. The granodiorite has been altered to create talus, and there are few outcrops, which only occur at stream bottoms and rarely at cliffs that have not been covered with talus. Lava flows from several more modern sources, likely Pleistocene, were deposited in the Lewis River canyon 4 miles (6.4 km) to the west of the Silver Star Mountain and in the Wind River canyon to the east.

Silver Star Mountain consists of late Eocene epoch to Oligocene epoch rock, particularly calc-alkaline volcaniclastic sediment, from a number of unidentified volcanic vents. These rock formations were intruded on the mountain's eastern side by the Silver Star intrusion, a deep stock of granodiorite and quartz diorite that also formed small deposits of copper in the area. Calc-alkaline volcaniclastic sediments, referred to as the Skamania Volcanics, lie nearby and are overlapped by the Troutdale Formation. During the Miocene epoch, these deposits formed hills to the north of the major Columbia River valley, with sufficient height to prevent flooding.

The intrusion of the Silver Star stock produced small deposits of gold, zinc, copper, zeolites, quartz and calcite in the surrounding country rock. Per the Skamania County Soil Survey, small abandoned gold mines can be found in creek bottoms throughout the area. E.A. Dole, an early settler, struck silver near the mountain in 1874. He named the mine Silver Star Quartz Ledge. The ore gathered was assayed at 41.17 silver and 63.72 lead per ton. Granite has been documented near the foot of the mountain, about 15 miles (24 km) northeast of the city of Washougal. The intrusion produced at least one dike of granodiorite, which sits nearby. Much of the local soil formed from granodiorite deposits and volcanic ash.

== Human history ==
A number of ditches near Silver Star Mountain known as the Indian Pits can be seen on one of the trails, which is known as the Indian Pits Trail #180E. These ditches also occur in other parts of the Columbia River Gorge area. Archaeologists debate the purpose of these pits, though three prominent hypotheses have emerged. One states that the pits were built by Native Americans to seek spiritual visions, while another claims that the pits served as blinds for hunting mountain sheep and goats fleeing cougars or wolves down local talus slopes or other hunters in brush below. The third hypothesis theorizes that the pits were used to store food.

The September 1902 Yacolt Burn started as a slash fire near the city of Stevenson. Spread by a strong, eastward blowing wind, it burned forest for 30 miles (48 km), reaching the town of Yacolt and killing 38 people. The fire encompassed close to 239,000 acres (970 km^{2}) of land across southwest Washington state, including parts of Clark, Cowlitz, and Skamania counties. 16 smaller fires followed in the next few decades, prompting government agencies to build a fire lookout on Silver Star, on the higher north peak known as "Star L.O.", which was installed in 1952, but was removed by 1969. The Yacolt Burn State Forest was named after the 1902 fire.

== Recreation ==
The Silver Star Mountain area is lightly used for hiking. The Silver Star trail runs 5 miles (8.0 km) to an old roadbed located west of Silver Star Mountain, while the Silver Star Summit Trail #180D, 0.25 miles (0.40 km) long, reaches the summit of Silver Star Mountain. Indian Pits Trail #180E and Pyramid Rock Trail #180F branch off the Silver Star Trail to the south of Silver Star Mountain. From Ed's Trail #180A, named after Edward Robinson, one of the pioneers of the Chinook Trail Association, hikers can see views of nearby volcanoes, including Mount St. Helens, Mount Rainier, Mount Adams, Mount Hood, and Mount Jefferson on particularly clear days. This has been described by local hikers as one of the best hikes in Washington state, only gaining about 1,200 feet (370 m) in elevation between the Silver Star and Ed's Trails. Trail #172 Bluff Mountain offers views of the Vancouver and Portland metropolitan area.

The trail area is administered by the United States Forest Service, and the Mount Adams Ranger District serves as its information center. A number of the trails were built by and are still maintained by the Chinook Trails Association.

== Sources ==
- "An Outline of the Geology of Washington", Washington Public Documents, vol. 3, Washington Geological Survey, 1902.
- Felts, W. M. (1939). "A Granodiorite Stock in the Cascade Mountains of South-western Washington" (PDF). Ohio Journal of Science. 39 (6): 297–316. hdl:1811/3048.
- Jolotta, P. (1993), Naming Clark County, Vancouver: Fort Vancouver Historical Society.
- Romano, C. (2011). Day Hiking Columbia River Gorge: National Scenic Area/Silver Star Scenic Area/Portland--Vancouver to The Dalles. The Mountaineers Books.
- "Soil Survey of Skamania County Area, Washington", Soil Conservation Service, United States Department of Agriculture, 1990.
- Wegmann, K. W.; Pringle, P. T. (2004). "Geologic Field Trip to the Aldercrest–Banyon Landslide and Mount St. Helens, Washington, Part I—Stevenson to Castle Rock" (PDF). Division of Geology and Earth Resources. Washington State Department of Natural Resources.
