= Larch Mountain (Multnomah County, Oregon) =

Mountain in Oregon, United States of America

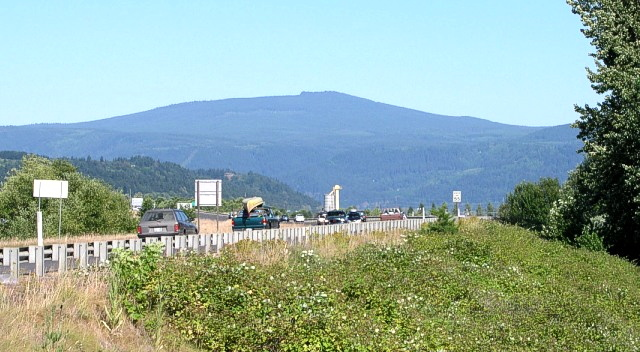
- Larch Mountain, as seen from Washougal, Washington.

Highest point
- Elevation: 4,061 ft (1,238 m) NAVD 88
- Prominence: 975 ft (297 m)
- Coordinates: 45°31′57″N 122°5′17″W

Geography
- Location: Multnomah County, Oregon, U.S.
- Topo map: USGS Multnomah Falls

Geology
- Rock age: 1.8–1.4 Ma
- Mountain type: Shield volcano
- Volcanic field: Boring Lava Field
- Last eruption: 1.4 Ma

Climbing
- Easiest route: paved road (June–October) hiking trails (November–May)

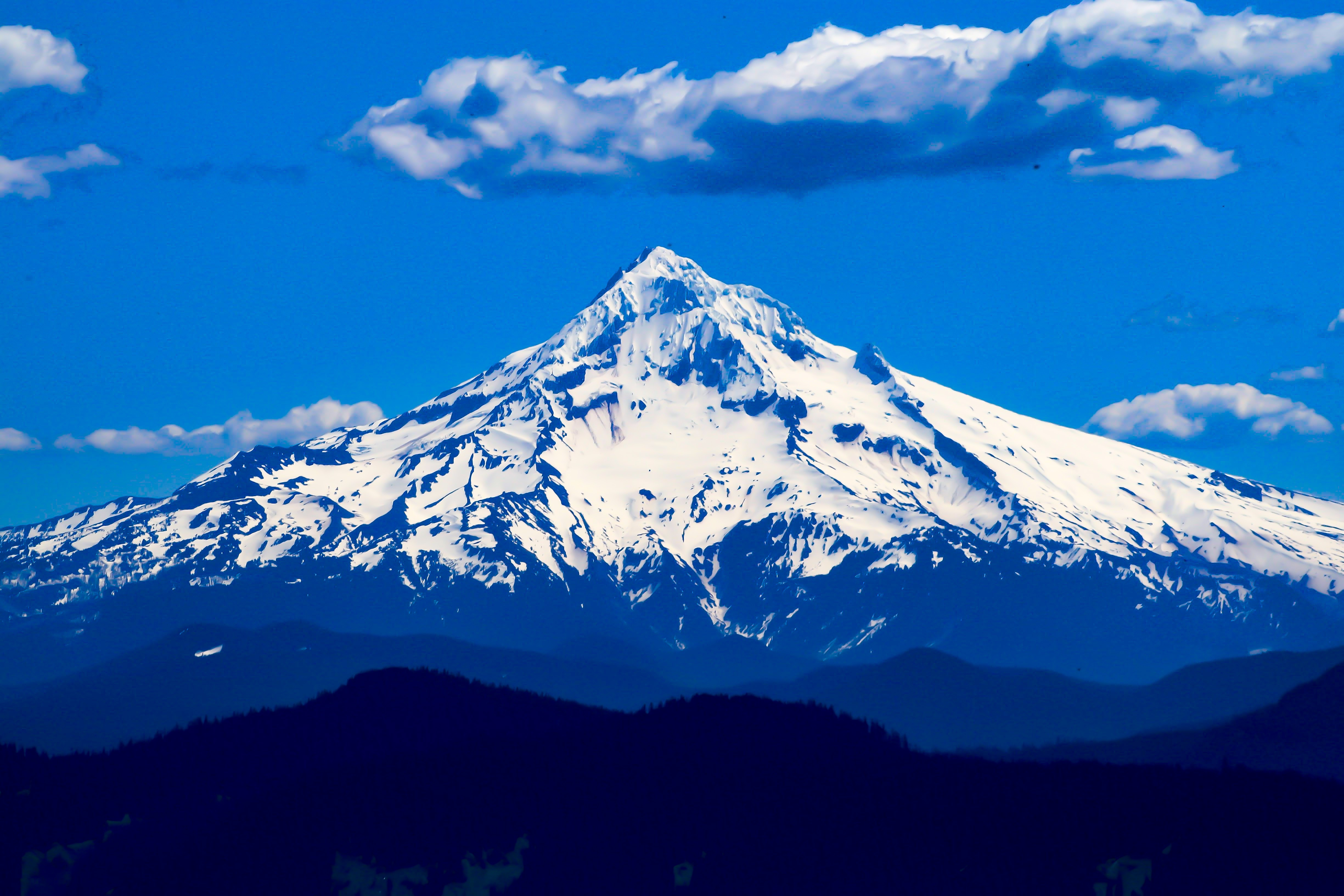
View of Mt Hood from Larch Mountain

Larch Mountain is an extinct volcano near Portland, Oregon. The name is misleading, as no western larch (a large coniferous tree) can be found there. It received that name when early lumbermen sold the noble fir wood as larch. The peak can be reached between May and November on paved Larch Mountain Road, 16 mi (26 km) east of Corbett, Oregon, although the road is closed during the winter and spring months. The road leading to Larch Mountain from the Historic Columbia River Highway is 14 miles long, which closed at milepost 10 from Nov. through late May or early June due to snow.

== Geography ==
Larch Mountain is located in Multnomah County, Oregon approximately 40 mi (64 km) east of Portland, above the Columbia River Gorge. Although it has an elevation of 4,061 ft (1,238 m), its prominence above the surrounding terrain is only 975 ft (297 m). The summit of the mountain is accessible by Larch Mountain Road between May and November, which branches off from the Historic Columbia River Highway 2 mi (3.2 km) east of Corbett. Due to the risk of driving on the mountain's upper slopes in winter weather, the road closes during the winter months at milepost 10.

== History ==
In 1879, Amos James Moore was the first known person to advocate for the logging and settling of Larch Mountain. Attractive due to its proximity to Portland and the Columbia River, it contained what were considered some of the highest-quality cedar, hemlock, and fir trees in the United States. In 1886, the Bridal Veil Lumbering Company started logging and constructed a lumber mill, followed a year later by the Latourrel Falls Wagon Road and Lumber Company. The operation rapidly expanded with the construction of a wooden plank road extending from Larch Mountain to the railroad line near the river, allowing for the large-scale logging of the mountain. The Bridal Veil Lumbering company became known for the high quality of its timber.

In 1902, a fire swept through one of the mills, completely destroying it as well as the town. Both were soon rebuilt in new locations. This event is often heralded as the start of the decline of the large-scale Victorian logging practices, which were replaced by more modern techniques. Only a few remnants of the former system exist today. Logging continued in the new forms on the mountain for several more decades. In 1928, the United States Forest Service began reforesting the slopes of Larch Mountain, so that more lumber could be produced. A fire in 1936 marked the end of the timber business on the mountain. Causing around $100,000 of damage, it severely damaged the lumber mill, which was not rebuilt due to the depletion of the timber supply on the mountain.

== Geology ==
Larch Mountain is the remnant of an ancient shield volcano, with broad slopes covering tens of square kilometers. It is currently the tallest peak in the Boring Lava Field, a volcanic field active during the Plio-Pleistocene time frame. Active between 1.8 and 1.4 million years ago, the volcano is composed mainly of basalts, although the summit at Sherrard Point is composed mainly of iron-rich andesite. Larch Mountain's basalt is tough to distinguish from the surrounding Columbia River Basalt, although the Columbia River Basalt is slightly lighter in color and less brittle. Sherrard Point is the eroded remains of the original volcanic plug.

Sherrard Point was exposed during the last glacial period, when the majority of the mountain's peak was destroyed by glaciers. The glaciers carved a large cirque into the mountain, forming a large lake. Over time, the lake was filled with sediment, and today the area is now a large meadow.

== Biology ==
Larch Mountain contains some of the largest old-growth forest stands left in the Columbia River Gorge area, characterized by the presence of many nurse logs. Dominant tree species include pacific silver fir, grand fir, Douglas fir, and western hemlock.

== Recreation ==
The Larch Mountain area contains multiple popular hiking trails. The Larch Mountain Trail #441 begins near the Columbia River at the Multnomah Falls Lodge and roughly follows Multnomah Creek, passing several waterfalls including the well-known Multnomah Falls, Weisendanger Falls, and Ecola Falls. The trail ends at the Larch Mountain parking lot, at a picnic area. The Sherrard Point Trail #443 leads from this area to Sherrard Point at the pinnacle. Sherrard Point offers an outstanding view of the nearby Cascade Range volcanoes Mount Hood, Mount Adams, Mount Jefferson, Mount Rainier, and Mount St. Helens. Elevation plaques are provided, showing the elevation of said volcanoes.

A loop around Larch Mountain itself is formed by the Larch Mountain Trail, the Multnomah Creek Way Trail #444, and the Oneonta Trail #424.

== Gallery ==
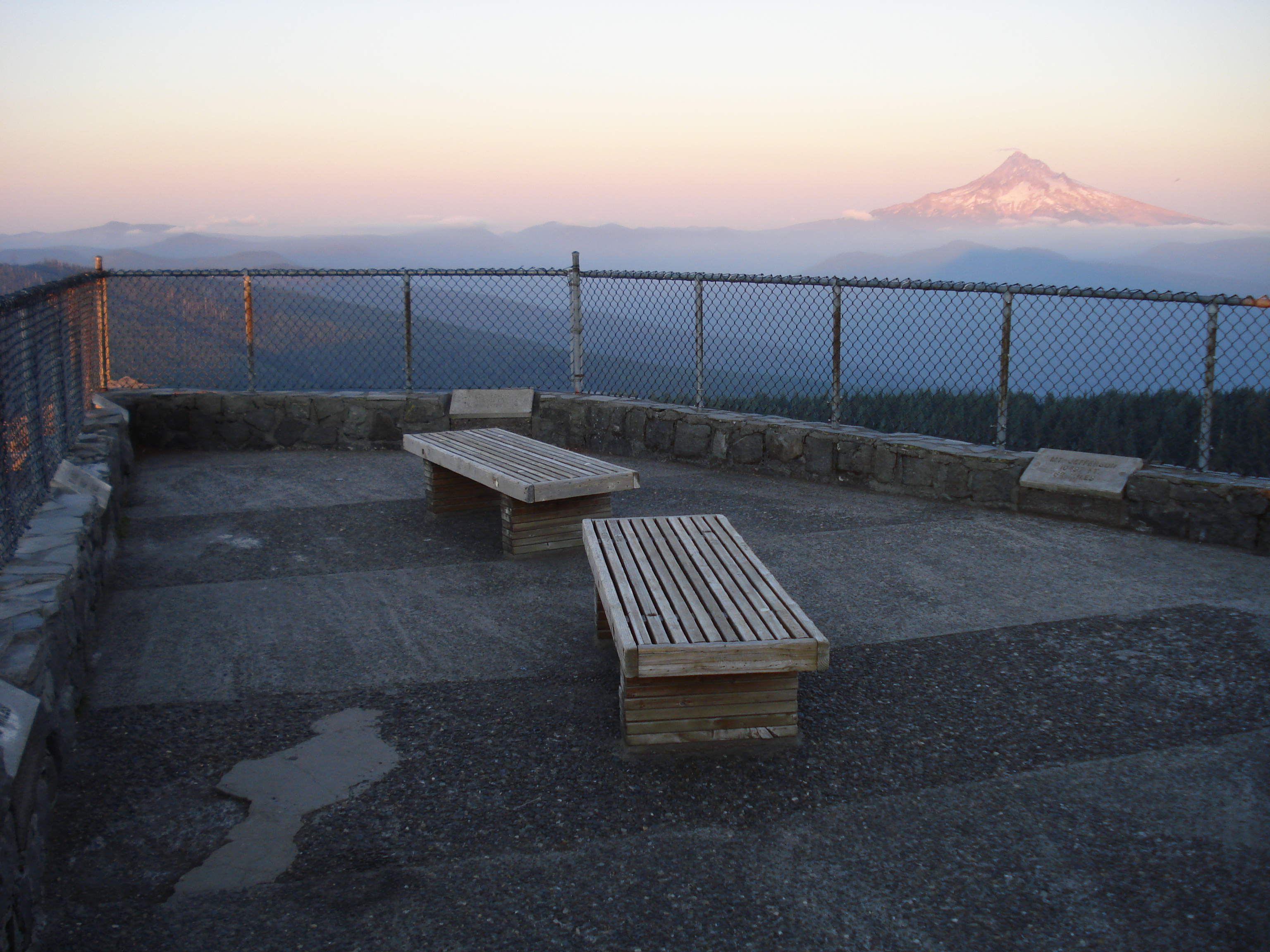
View from the summit with Mount Hood in the distance.

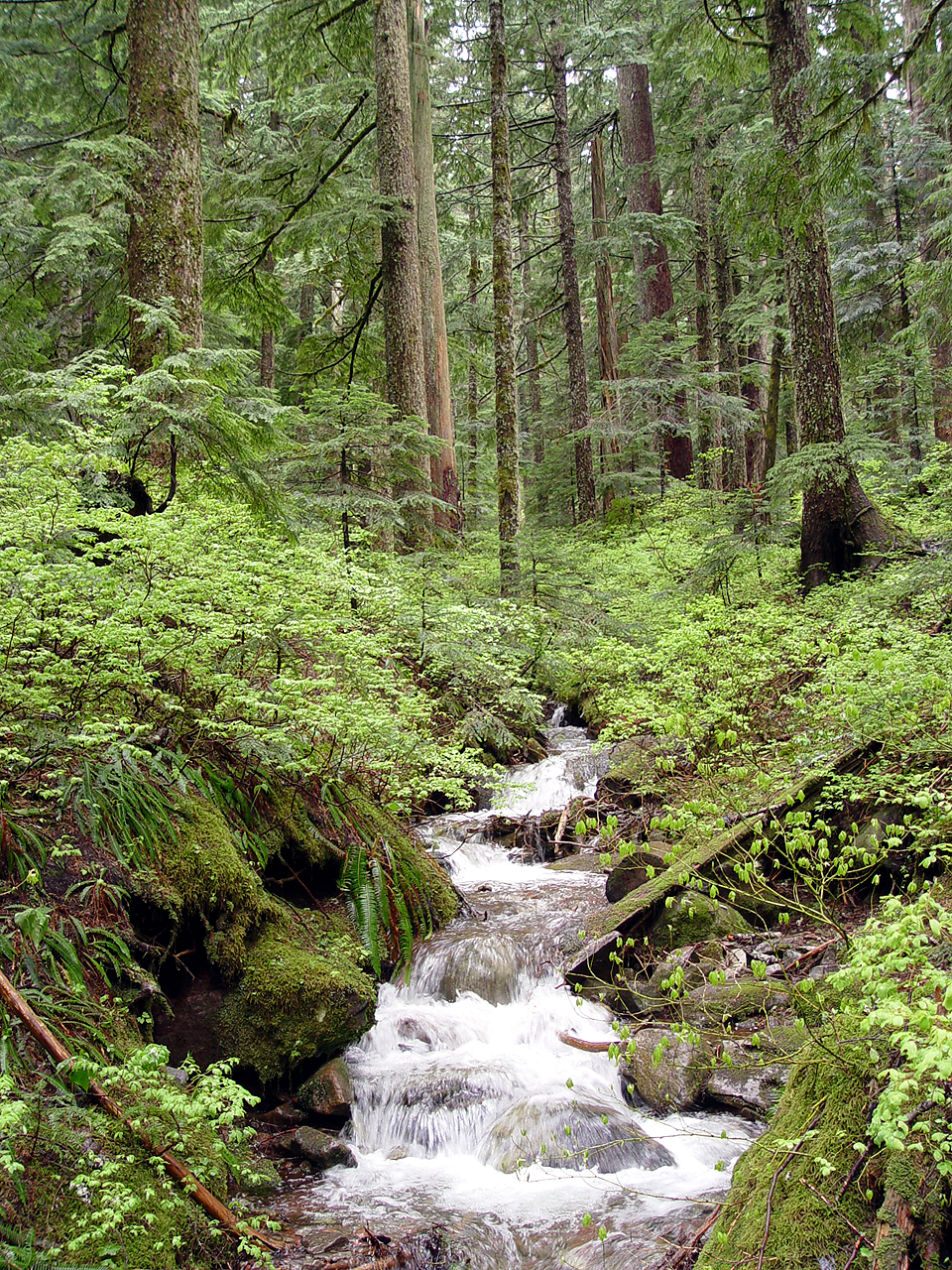
A creek in Larch Mountain forest.

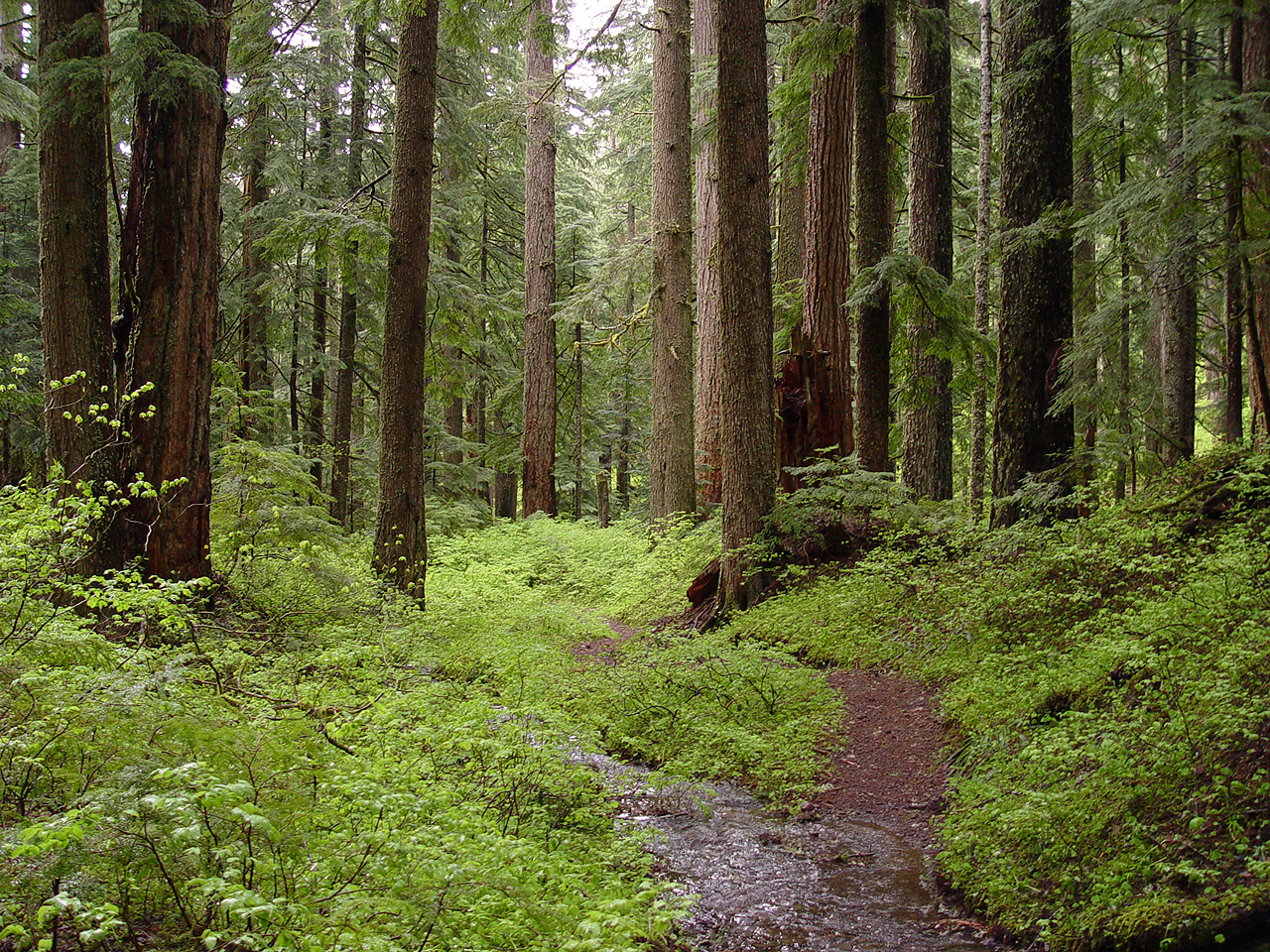
Old-growth forest

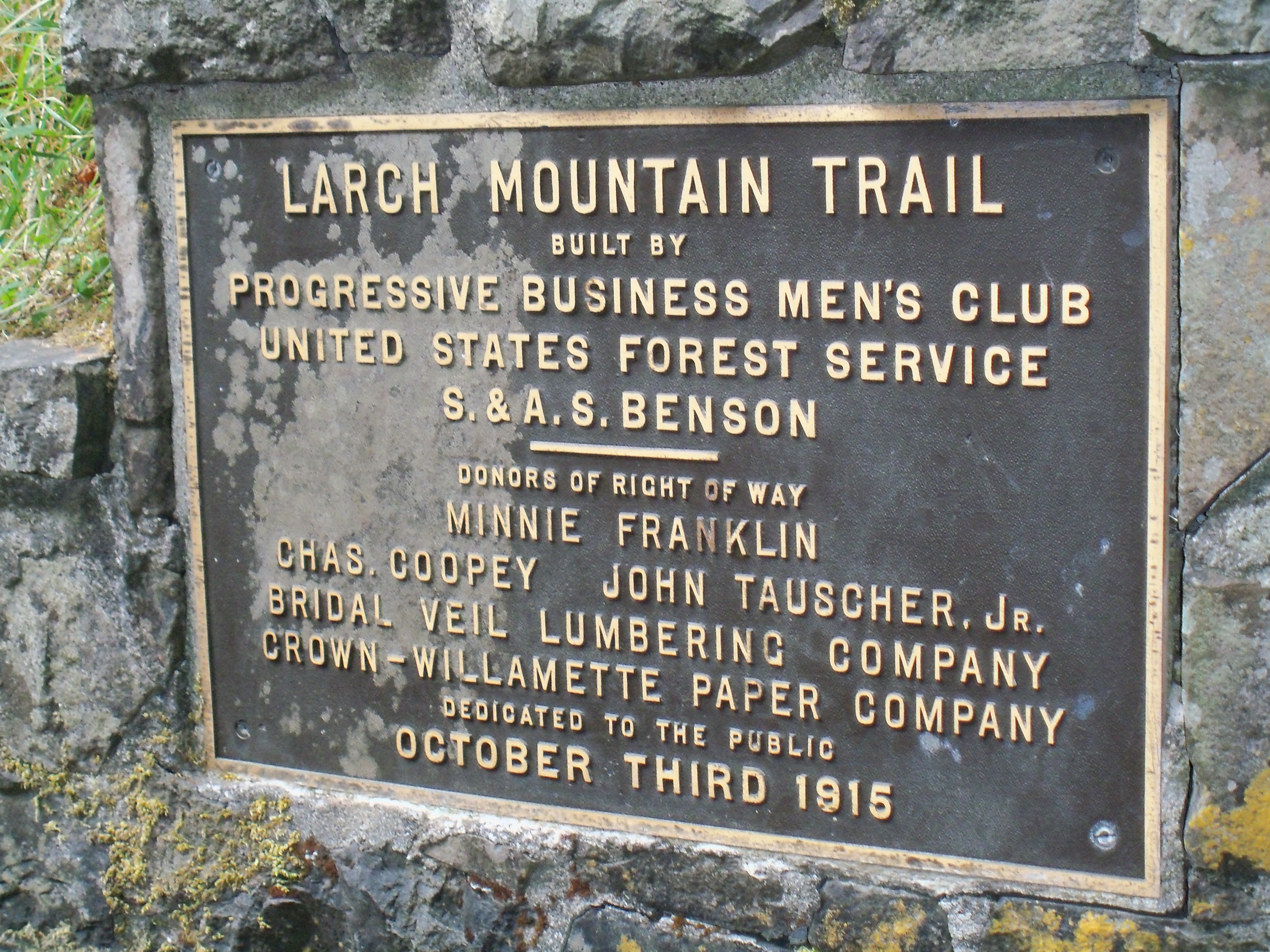
Larch Mountain Trail plaque

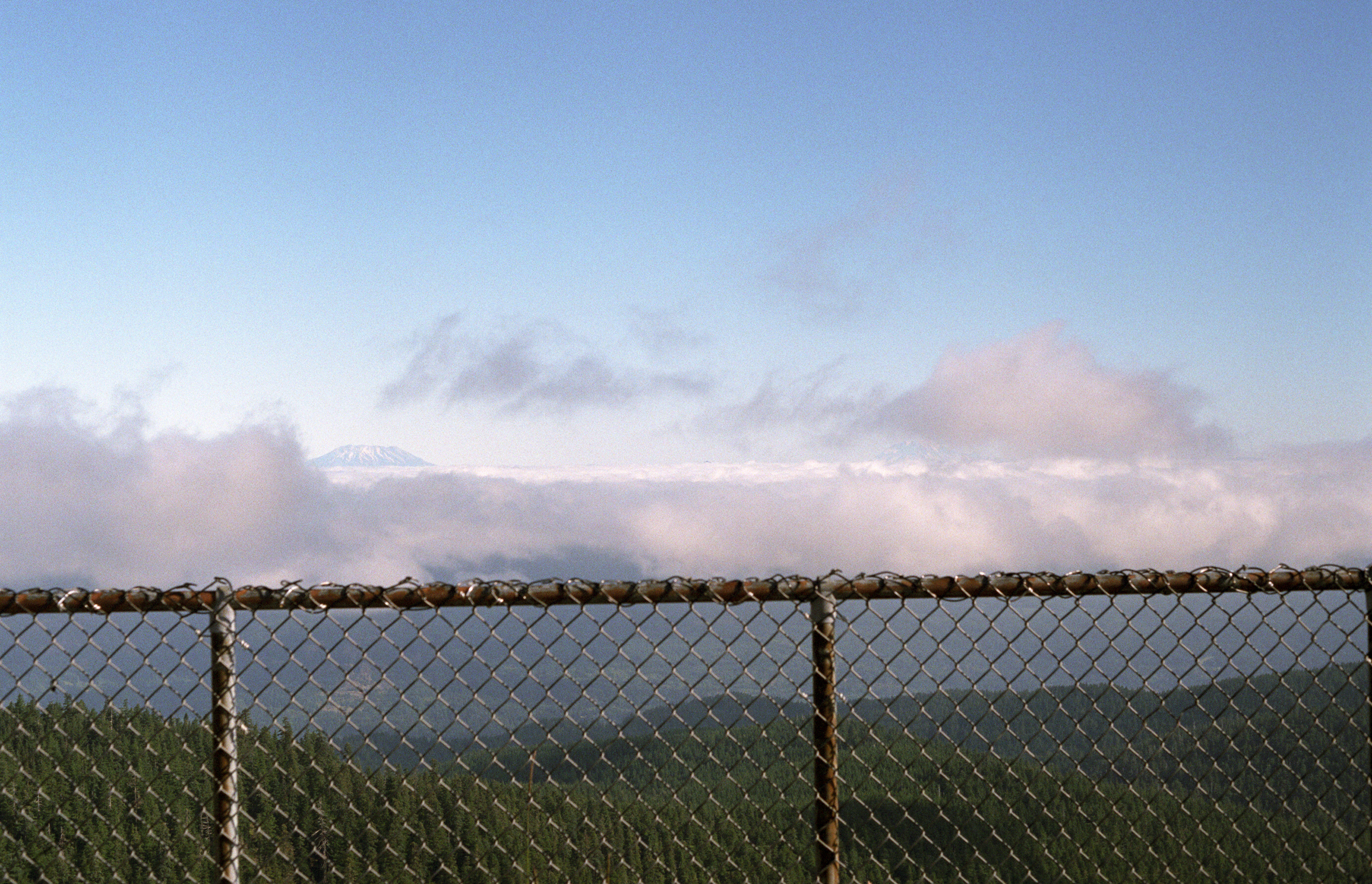
View of Mt St Helens from the summit of Larch Mountain

== See also ==
- Larch Mountain (Clark County, Washington)
- Larch Mountain (Washington County, Oregon)
