= Multnomah Creek =

- Location of the mouth of Multnomah Creek in Oregon

Location
- Country: United States
- State: Oregon

Physical characteristics
- Source: Larch Mountain in Mount Hood National Forest
  - coordinates: 45°32′07″N 122°05′30″W
  - elevation: 2,480 ft (760 m)
- Mouth: Columbia River
  - coordinates: 45°34′39″N 122°07′14″W
  - elevation: 33 ft (10 m)

Multnomah Creek is a 5-mile-long (8.0 km) stream in northern Oregon. Multnomah Creek's source is on Larch Mountain in the Mount Hood National Forest and its waters flow north to the Columbia River Gorge, over Multnomah Falls into Benson Lake and then the Columbia River. The waterfall is accessible from the Historic Columbia River Highway and Interstate 84. The two drop waterfall is the tallest in the state of Oregon at 620 ft (189 m) in height.

== History ==
The creek appears to be named for the Multnomah people. Note that the Multnomah River is the historical name of the Willamette River.

== Recreation ==
Multnomah Falls is actually a combination of two falls: the upper falls drops 542 feet, and the lower falls drops 69 feet. This Multnomah Falls hike provides excellent views of the entire falls.
