= Larch, Michigan =

- Unincorporated community
- Location within the state of Michigan
- Coordinates: 45°47′23″N 87°03′52″W
- Country: United States
- State: Michigan
- County: Delta
- Township: Wells
- Elevation: 600 ft (183 m)
- Time zone: UTC-5 (Eastern (EST))
  - Summer (DST): UTC-4 (EDT)
- ZIP code(s): 49837
- Area code: 906
- GNIS feature ID: 630162

Larch is an unincorporated community in Delta County, in the U.S. state of Michigan.

== History ==
The community was named from a grove of American larch near the original town site.
