= The Larches (Cambridge, Massachusetts) =

Historic house in Massachusetts, United States

- U.S. National Register of Historic Places
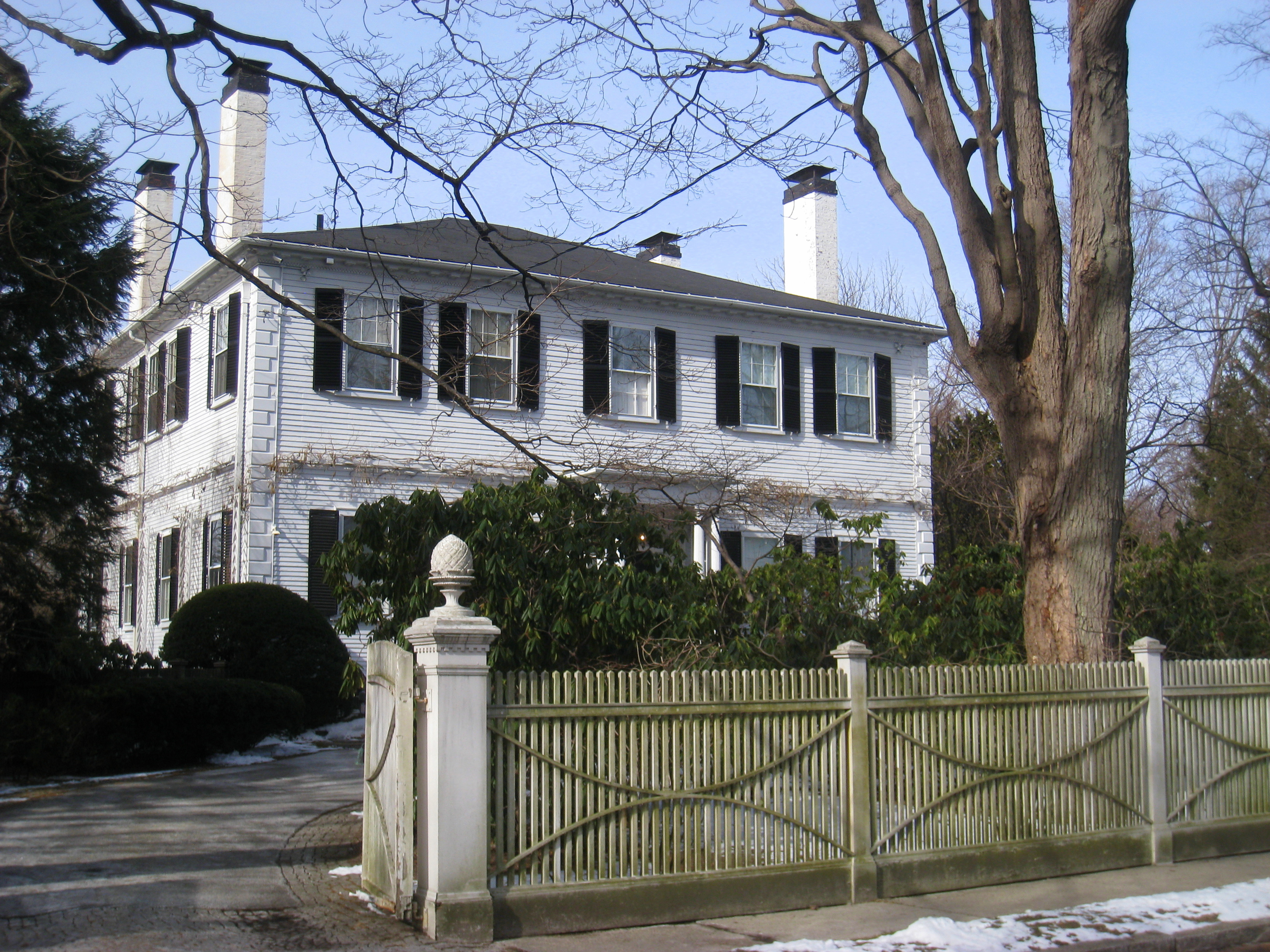

- Location within Massachusetts Location within the United States
- Location: Cambridge, Massachusetts
- Coordinates: 42°22′35.7″N 71°8′32.7″W
- Built: 1808
- Architect: Alexander Wadsworth Longfellow Jr.
- Architectural style: Georgian
- MPS: Cambridge MRA
- NRHP reference No.: 82001956
- Added to NRHP: April 13, 1982

The Larches is a historic house at 22 Larch Road in Cambridge, Massachusetts. This 2 1/2-story wood-frame house was built c. 1808, and originally stood on one of the last of Cambridge's large Brattle Street estates to be subdivided. It was moved to its present location in 1915, at which time it underwent renovations and alterations designed by Alexander Wadsworth Longfellow Jr. The building's interior and exterior both retain significant Federal style detailing. The house was built by William Gray, a Salem merchant, as a summer house. Twentieth century owners included composer Randall Thompson.

The house was listed on the National Register of Historic Places in 1982.

== See also ==
- National Register of Historic Places listings in Cambridge, Massachusetts
