= Larch Campbell Renshaw =

American architect

Larch Campbell Renshaw Smith (1906–2002) was an American architect who practiced primarily in Connecticut and Florida, designing residences in the 1930s through the 1970s and writing for architectural publications.

== Personal life and education ==
Larch Campbell was born on May 6, 1906, in Monte Vista, Colorado, to Mildred Wadsworth and Bert Campbell. By 1910, Campbell was living in Rio Grande County, Colorado, with her mother, who was working as a saleswoman in a dry goods store, and her older sister Frances, who was born in Illinois in 1902. By 1924, she was enrolled at the University of Wisconsin–Madison, where she was involved in student life and played on the field hockey team and was an officer in the university's division of the Intercollegiate Club.

After completing at least two years at the University of Wisconsin–Madison in 1926, she moved to New York to attend Columbia University's School of Architecture. She graduated with a Bachelor of Architecture degree in 1929, and married classmate Palmer C.R. Renshaw in May of that same year. Shortly after their wedding, they traveled through Europe for several months, with plans to open an architectural practice together. However, in January 1931, Palmer C.R. Renshaw died at the age of 28 from pneumonia.

== Career ==
After her husband's death in 1931, Campbell Renshaw worked as a draftswoman at the Small House Service Advisory until 1934. In 1938, she opened her own firm and began practicing in Connecticut, where she maintained a license. She also maintained licensure in New York and Virginia in the 1930s and later in Florida.

== Built Work ==
Campbell Renshaw primarily worked on residential projects, both new construction and renovation work. Through the 1930s, her work consisted largely of smaller-scale residential projects. In 1938, she completed the restoration of a historic home in Litchfield, Connecticut, soon followed by two new residences in Darien, Connecticut. She also did remodeling work of a villa in Italy and one in Virginia, as well as the design of a guest house in Maryland.

Into the 1940s, she continued to practice alone, and was featured in a display of leading architects of Connecticut – "Small Homes are the Fashion"—and was the only woman represented. In 1943, she wrote a two-part piece called “Household Closets: Time-Saver Standards” for Architectural Record, and in 1947 was the executive director of the Town of Stamford Housing Authority. In this capacity, she oversaw the development of a veterans' village. In 1948, she wrote “A Thousand Women in Architecture” and several other pieces for Architectural Record, and through the 1950s designed multiple apartment buildings in Connecticut, including a garden apartment development of 23 units in New Canaan, Connecticut in 1955. It was the first of its type in the community, and was sited to face Mead Park; and J Elliott Smith Apartments was the builder.

By the 1962, she had moved to Florida and continued to work on residential projects including a residence in Palm Beach and in 1970 the renovation of Gulf High School in New Port Richey.

== Personal life ==
In 1975, Larch Campbell Renshaw married Bruce Furman Smith in Pinellas, Florida.

She died in 2002.

== Publications ==
Campbell, Larch. "Household Closets. Time-Saver Standards. Part I: Basic Elements." Architectural Record, Volume 94 (July 1943): pages 83–86.

Campbell, Larch. "Household Closets. Part II. Time-Saver Standards. Architectural Record, Volume 95 (January 1944): 105–110.

Campbell, Larch. "Time-Saver Standards: The Household Laundry, Architectural Record, Volume 98 (July 1945): 109.

Campbell, Larch. "A thousand women in architecture." Architectural Record, Volume 103 (March 1948): 105–113.
