= Bridal Veil, Oregon =

Unincorporated community in the state of Oregon, United States

- Unincorporated community
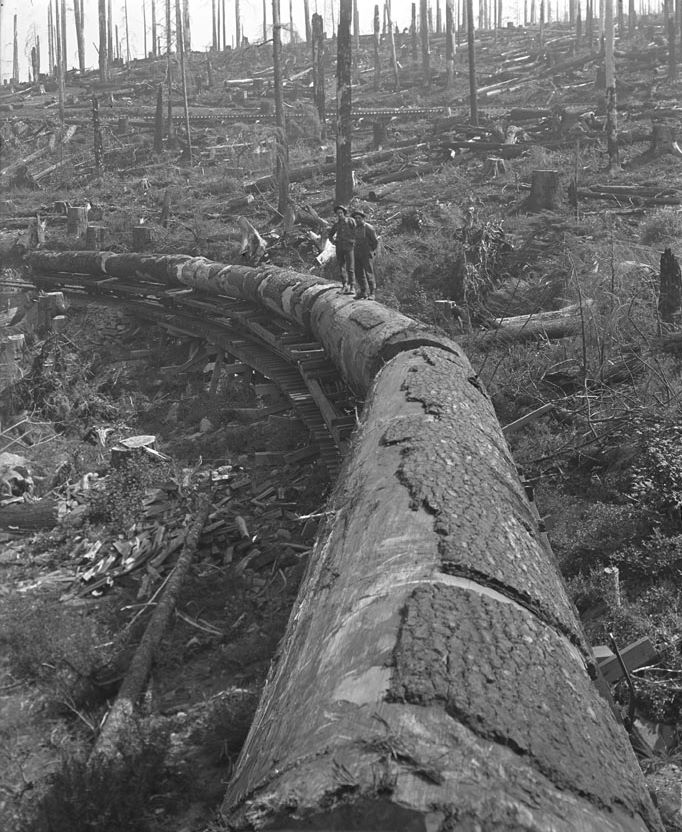
- Train load of larch as seen from cab. Bridal Veil Lumber Company, Oregon, 1910.

- Location within Oregon Location within the United States
- Coordinates: 45°33′32″N 122°10′31″W
- Country: United States
- State: Oregon
- County: Multnomah
- Elevation: 118 ft (36 m)
- Time zone: UTC-8 (Pacific (PST))
  - Summer (DST): UTC-7 (PDT)
- ZIP codes: 97010
- Area code: 503/971
- GNIS feature ID: 1138601

Bridal Veil is a virtual ghost town located in Multnomah County, Oregon, United States. It was established in the 1880s during a logging boom by a logging company as it harvested timber on nearby Larch Mountain to be a company mill town around a sawmill. It had a close relationship with the logging town of Palmer for the first 50 years of its history. As of November 2011, all that remains of the town is a post office and a cemetery. The site is located near the west end of the Columbia River Gorge.

== History ==
Bridal Veil was established in 1886. Bridal Veil functioned as the Bridal Veil Falls Lumbering Company and built a sawmill one mile (1.6 km) up Larch Mountain. The company operated in Bridal Veil and the surrounding area from 1886 to 1936. A mile and half up the timber-rich mountain was the logging town of Palmer. Palmer and Bridal Veil shared common ownership as company mill towns. Together, the two towns produced lumber and were codependent. A V-shaped log flume was built for the rough cut timber to get down the mountain to the planing mill at the railroad tracks in Bridal Veil. After the timber was logged on the mountain, they were brought to the sawmill in Palmer. As the rough-cut lumber exited Palmer's mill it traveled down the flume the mile and a half to the finishing mill in Bridal Veil. The dependency between the two towns ended in 1936 when the mill at Palmer was shut down.

In 1936, fire struck the mill as the timber resources on Larch Mountain were running out. The Bridal Veil Falls Lumbering Company ended its ownership of the mill with the fire and ceased to operate in the town. In 1937, the entire town and its mills were bought by a company that became Bridal Veil Lumber and Box Company, which made wooden cheese boxes for Kraft Food Company. The company continued to operate in Bridal Veil until 1960 when it closed its doors. Today the boxes made in Bridal Veil are considered collectible antiques.

From 1955 to 1960, the company's president, Leonard Kraft, published a newsletter that covered such issues as business and prospects but also provided society information about potluck dinners, who was sick in town, who was visiting Bridal Veil and who had marked a recent anniversary with the company. Bridal Veil Lumber & Box Co. News Letter was the "newspaper" of the Lumber and Box Company but it also became the newspaper for Bridal Veil and its 100 residents. The mill continued to operate under various owners through 1988.

=== Namesake ===
Legend has it that while traveling on the Columbia River a passenger on the sternwheeler, Baily Gatzert, saw Bridal Veil Falls and remarked that it looked like a "delicate, misty bride's veil." As the years went by people began to refer to this spot along the Columbia River Gorge as Bride's Veil, Oregon. When the first post office opened in about 1886, and the railroad built a small station there, the community was officially named Bridal Veil.

== Legacy ==
In 1990, the Trust for Public Land acquired Bridal Veil and its buildings. Despite a ten-year fight from the Crown Point Country Historical Society to preserve the mill houses and buildings in Bridal Veil, the trust had them demolished in 2001. As of July 2006, the trust was preparing to sell the land and the buildings to the United States Forest Service.

On Memorial Day 2006, the Bridal Veil Historical Preservation Society held a service in the Bridal Veil Cemetery. The society had gained the deed to the cemetery, which saw its last burial in 1934. Volunteers, along with society president Geri Canzler and her husband Rod, work to maintain the cemetery. To track down the owners of the cemetery—the heirs to the founders of the Bridal Veil Lumbering Company—the society had to employ the use of volunteer attorneys and title searchers. With possession of the land title, the society now has the exclusive right to preserve the cemetery, whose stones bear witness to the diphtheria and smallpox epidemics that swept through Bridal Veil over a century ago. Canzler, together with other area residents, is working to gain the title to the building and land of the Bridal Veil Community Church for the society as well, with aspirations to gain the post office deed one day too.

On October 27, 2011, the Bridal Veil Community Church was demolished, leaving only the cemetery and post office as the remnants of the town.

== Postmark ==
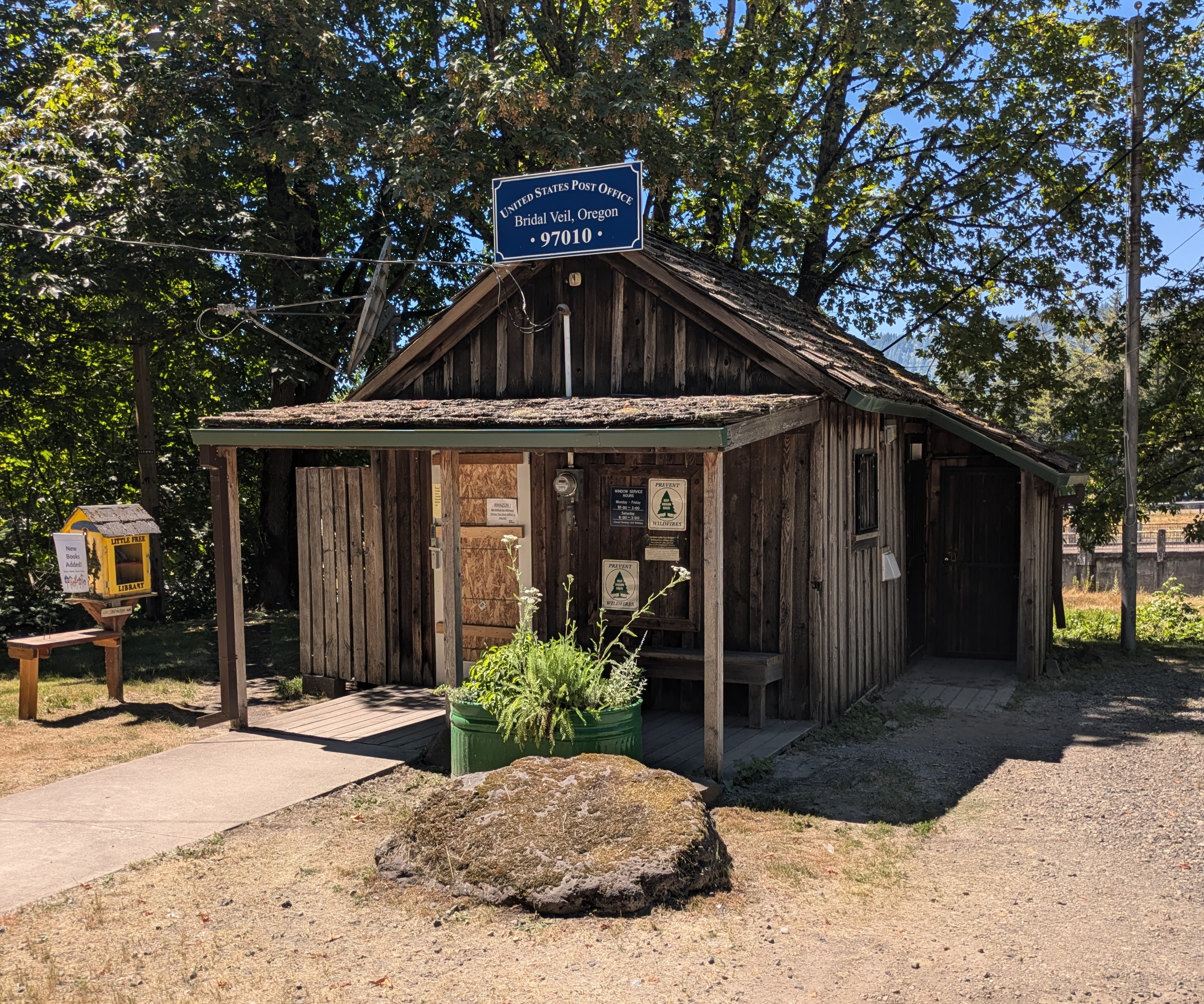
The Bridal Veil post office in 2024

One reason Bridal Veil still exists is its postmark, which attracts thousands of brides who bring their wedding invitations to Bridal Veil. During the spring and summer, the height of wedding season, the post office is filled with thousands of wedding invitations awaiting its postmark. The wedding business and support from locals every time the federal government threatens shut down of the Bridal Veil post office has helped keep the town going long after the logging industry left the town.

== Notable people ==
- Hershel McGriff, 1986 NASCAR Winston West Series champion, born 1927

== See also ==
- List of ghost towns in Oregon
