= Yacolt Burn State Forest =

State forest in Washington, United States

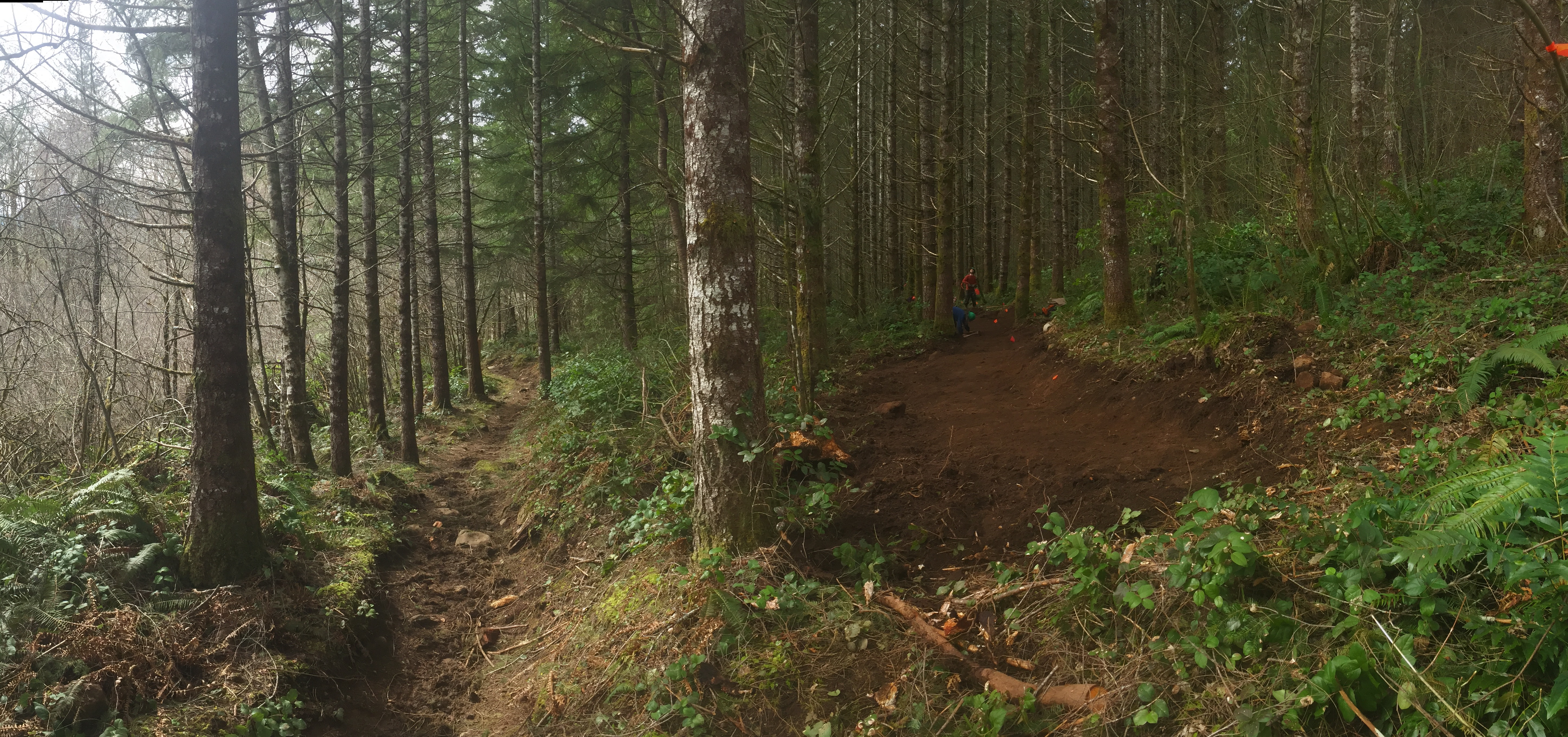
- Trailwork in Yacolt Burn State Forest, 2017

- Location within Washington (state) Location within the United States
- Coordinates: 45.762439°N 122.33032°W
- Area: 90,000 acres (360 km^{2})
- Owner: Washington Department of Natural Resources

Yacolt Burn State Forest is a 90,000 acre state forest located in southern Washington in the foothills of the Cascade Range. It is named after the Yacolt Burn, a collection of wildfires that broke out in 1902. The Washington State Department of Natural Resources manages the land for timber harvesting and recreation.

Long-term ecological research is conducted within a portion of the forest called Abby Road.

== Recreation ==
Yacolt Burn State Forest has a trail system that can accommodate horseback riding, off-road vehicles, mountain biking, and hiking. Target shooting is also allowed. There are several maintained campgrounds located within the forest.
