= Larch Mountain (Clark County, Washington) =

Mountain in Washington (state), United States

Highest point
- Elevation: 3480+ ft, (1061+ m)
- Prominence: 1,080 ft (329 m)
- Coordinates: 45°43′01″N 122°17′44″W

Geography
- Location: Clark County, Washington, U.S.
- Parent range: Cascade Range
- Topo map: USGS Larch Mountain

Larch Mountain, elevation 3,480 feet (1,060 m), is the highest free-standing peak in Clark County, Washington. (The andesite plugs Pyramid Rock and Sturgeon Rock are higher but are outcroppings on ridges of Silver Star Mountain.) It is laced by a network of gravel roads as part of the Yacolt Burn State Forest. The eastern flank of the mountain was scorched by a gigantic forest fire in September 1902 and subsequently experienced a massive rockslide that rendered that side mostly unvegetated. The southern section of the mountain is part of the Jones Creek Off-Road Vehicle recreation area. From the picnic area at the top, the view is west toward the Vancouver, Washington area and east to Silver Star. A minimum security prison/work camp is situated nearby, whose inmates construct fire roads, fire trails, maintain campgrounds and help fight fires in the area.

== Livingston Mountain Washington ==
Livingston Mountain is Larch Mountain's sister peak. It lies North of Camas, Washington. Livingston Mountain has gained popularity in recent years with developers. However, Camp Bonneville occupies much of the North and West flanks of the mountain, limiting the development in that area. The Mountain is only 25 minutes from the Portland Airport. The Livingston and Larch area is abundant with wild life including deer, elk, black bear, coyote, grouse, bald eagles, bobcat and mountain lion. The Flora is also quite abundant tall evergreens, lush ferns, huckle berries and many more. Due to the Yacolt Burn most trees are only half of a century old but it is not uncommon to find a tree or two that escaped the burn and now towers over the surrounding trees.
