= Larch Mountain (Washington County, Oregon) =

- Location within Oregon Location within the United States

Highest point
- Elevation: 3,452 ft (1,052 m)
- Prominence: 344 ft (105 m)
- Coordinates: 45°39′33″N 123°25′37″W

Geography
- Location: Washington County. Oregon, U.S.
- Parent range: Northern Oregon Coast Range
- Topo map: USGS Cochran

Larch Mountain is a mountain in the Northern Oregon Coast Range in Washington County, Oregon, United States. It is the second highest peak in the county with an elevation of 3,452 ft (1,052 m.) It is located near Timber, on Oregon Route 6.
