= Dollars Corner, Washington =

- Census-designated place
- Location of Dollars Corner, Washington
- Coordinates: 45°46′49″N 122°36′00″W
- Country: United States
- State: Washington
- County: Clark

Area
  - Total: 3.9 sq mi (10.2 km^{2})
  - Land: 3.9 sq mi (10.2 km^{2})
  - Water: 0 sq mi (0.0 km^{2})
- Elevation: 223 ft (68 m)

Population (2020)
  - Total: 1,246
  - Density: 280/sq mi (108.1/km^{2})
- Time zone: UTC-8 (Pacific (PST))
  - Summer (DST): UTC-7 (PDT)
- ZIP Code: 98604
- Area code(s): 360, 564
- FIPS code: 53-18195
- GNIS feature ID: 2408679

Dollars Corner is a census-designated place (CDP) in Clark County, Washington, United States. The population was 1,246 at the 2020 census, up from 1,108 at the 2010 census.

== History ==
In 1917, Mr. and Mrs. S. L. Dollar purchased a farm near what would later be named Dollars Corner. The couple reportedly exchanged $150 and two cows for the land. They opened a small store and service station on one corner in 1924, which became a local landmark. One story claims that the name was coined by local sheriff's deputies, who would report to their superiors that they traveled "as far as Dollar's Corner."

In 2012, the landscape of Dollars Corner began to change drastically as a result of the realignment of Washington State Route 502. Historic buildings situated directly on the corner were demolished, with the exception of the former O'Brady's Drive-In restaurant, which became the center of a protracted compensation dispute.

== Geography ==
Dollars Corner is located in west-central Clark County. The community is bordered to the northeast by Cherry Grove, to the east by the city of Battle Ground, to the southeast by Meadow Glade, and to the west by Duluth. Washington State Route 502 passes through the center of the community, leading east 3 miles (5 km) to the center of Battle Ground and west 3 miles (5 km) to Interstate 5's Exit 11. Dollars Corner is located around 15 miles (24 km) northeast of Vancouver, Washington.

According to the United States Census Bureau, the Dollars Corner CDP has a total area of 3.9 square miles (10.2 km^{2}), all of it land.

== Demographics ==
Historical population
Census	Pop.	Note	%±
2000	1,039		—
2010	1,108		6.6%
2020	1,246		12.5%
U.S. Decennial Census; 1990 2000 2010

The community first appeared as a census designated place using the name Dollar Corner in the 2000 U.S. census. The name was corrected to Dollars Corner for the 2010 U.S. census.

=== Racial and ethnic composition ===
Dollars Corner CDP, Washington – Racial and ethnic composition Note: the US Census treats Hispanic/Latino as an ethnic category. This table excludes Latinos from the racial categories and assigns them to a separate category. Hispanics/Latinos may be of any race.
Race / Ethnicity (NH = Non-Hispanic)	Pop 2000	Pop 2010	Pop 2020	% 2000	% 2010	% 2020
White alone (NH)	967	984	1,047	93.07%	88.81%	84.03%
Black or African American alone (NH)	11	2	3	1.06%	0.18%	0.24%
Native American or Alaska Native alone (NH)	8	9	8	0.77%	0.81%	0.64%
Asian alone (NH)	4	20	8	0.38%	1.81%	0.64%
Native Hawaiian or Pacific Islander alone (NH)	0	8	2	0.00%	0.72%	0.16%
Other race alone (NH)	0	1	4	0.00%	0.09%	0.32%
Mixed race or Multiracial (NH)	19	20	93	1.83%	1.81%	7.46%
Hispanic or Latino (any race)	30	64	81	2.89%	5.78%	6.50%
Total	1,039	1,108	1,246	100.00%	100.00%	100.00%

=== 2000 census ===
As of the census of 2000, there were 1,039 people, 373 households, and 299 families residing in the CDP. The population density was 260.8 people per square mile (100.8/km^{2}). There were 391 housing units at an average density of 98.1/sq mi (37.9/km^{2}). The racial makeup of the CDP was 94.90% White, 1.06% African American, 0.77% Native American, 0.48% Asian, 0.87% from other races, and 1.92% from two or more races. Hispanic or Latino of any race were 2.89% of the population. 22.7% were of German, 13.4% Finnish, 12.0% Irish, 11.9% American, 8.0% English, 7.2% European and 6.1% Swedish ancestry according to Census 2000.

There were 373 households, out of which 30.0% had children under the age of 18 living with them, 68.4% were married couples living together, 7.8% had a female householder with no husband present, and 19.8% were non-families. 15.0% of all households were made up of individuals, and 5.9% had someone living alone who was 65 years of age or older. The average household size was 2.79 and the average family size was 3.09.

In the CDP, the age distribution of the population shows 26.8% under the age of 18, 5.8% from 18 to 24, 26.3% from 25 to 44, 28.3% from 45 to 64, and 12.9% who were 65 years of age or older. The median age was 40 years. For every 100 females, there were 102.5 males. For every 100 females age 18 and over, there were 100.8 males.

The median income for a household in the CDP was $56,875, and the median income for a family was $58,090. Males had a median income of $40,242 versus $27,569 for females. The per capita income for the CDP was $21,025. About 6.5% of families and 5.5% of the population were below the poverty line, including 7.4% of those under age 18 and 13.2% of those age 65 or over.

== Education ==
The community is served by the Battle Ground School District.

School zoning is as follows: About 75% of Dollars Corner is zoned to Daybreak School for K-8. The remainder is zoned to Maple Grove Primary School and Daybreak's middle school program. All residents are zoned to Prairie High School.
