= Hockinson High School =

Coordinates: 45°44′12″N 122°29′59″W

Location
- 16819 NE 159th Street; Brush Prairie, Washington; United States

Information
- Type: Public
- Opened: 2003
- School district: Hockinson School District
- Principal: Tim Fox
- Staff: 30.90 (FTE)
- Grades: 9 - 12
- Enrollment: 681 (2023-2024)
- Student to teacher ratio: 22.04
- Colors: Navy Blue, Columbia Blue, white
- Mascot: Hawk
- WIAA Class: 2A
- Conference: Greater St. Helens 2A
- Website: www.hocksd.org/o/hhs

Hockinson High School is a school in Hockinson, Washington. There are just under 700 students. The official mascot is the Hawk, and the school colors are navy, columbia blue, and silver. Built in 2003, it is a part of the Hockinson School District in Clark County, located in the southwest region of the state. It is the only high school in the district. The school is led by principal Tim Fox.

== Curriculum ==
Hockinson High School has a comprehensive curriculum of Language Arts, Math, Social Studies, Science, Art, Foreign Language (Spanish and French), Physical Education, Health, Fine and Performing Arts (Band and Theater), along with Career and Technical education.

Hockinson High School participates in the College in the High School program through Central Washington University. Students in Pre-Calculus, Statistics, Environmental Science, Spanish, History of Rock and Roll, and Weightlifting can earn university credit directly from CWU free of charge. The courses are offered on campus and taught by high school teachers who receive adjunct professor status at CWU.

== Sports ==
Hockinson High School currently competes in the Washington Interscholastic Activities Association (WIAA) Greater St. Helens League at the 2A level. Despite being one of the smallest schools in the state’s 2A level, it is highly competitive.

The school currently fields these sports:

- Baseball
- Boys Basketball
- Boys Tennis (co-op)
- Girls Basketball
- Cross Country
- Equestrian
- Football
- Boys Golf
- Girls Golf
- Gymnastics (co-op)
- Boys Soccer
- Girls Soccer
- Softball
- Boys Swimming
- Girls Swimming
- Girls Tennis
- Boys Tennis
- Track and Field
- Volleyball
- Wrestling

== Controversy ==
In 2024, the school district was sued. The school allegedly refused to follow a student's IEP (individualized education plan) because there were cameras in the home. The school signed paperwork acknowledging the cameras and being okay with their presence in the past. The lawsuit was dismissed.
