= Venersborg, Washington =

- Census-designated place
- Location of Venersborg, Washington
- Coordinates: 45°47′02″N 122°29′20″W
- Country: United States
- State: Washington
- County: Clark

Area
  - Total: 10.9 sq mi (28.3 km^{2})
  - Land: 10.9 sq mi (28.3 km^{2})
  - Water: 0 sq mi (0.0 km^{2})
- Elevation: 568 ft (173 m)

Population (2020)
  - Total: 3,990
  - Density: 365/sq mi (141/km^{2})
- Time zone: UTC-8 (Pacific (PST))
  - Summer (DST): UTC-7 (PDT)
- FIPS code: 53-74585
- GNIS feature ID: 2409507

Venersborg is a census-designated place (CDP) in Clark County, Washington, United States. The population was 3,990 at the 2020 census.

== History ==
The community was established as "Venner's Villas" in the late 19th and early 20th centuries when a land entrepreneur, J. C. Lanerberg, purchased land from various sources including the government, railroad companies, and other landowners. He divided the land into 10-acre (40,000 m^{2}) lots. To market the area, Lanerberg produced pamphlets written in Swedish that highlighted its resemblance to rural Sweden. The flyers were concentrated in large, urban communities throughout the United States and the first settlers who arrived in the early 1900s were mostly of Swedish ancestry. The growth of nearby Vancouver and Portland led to an influx of new residents in the 1960s.

The land was originally heavily timbered. A number of farms and orchards were established in the early 20th century, some of which have existed into the 3rd millennium that grow rare, heirloom apple varieties.

The community is considered rural and the town supports three non-residential buildings. A single commercial establishment, the Venersborg Store, reopened in 2008 but closed in 2013.

== Geography ==
Venersborg is located in central Clark County. The area is bordered to the northwest by Lewisville, to the west by the city of Battle Ground, and to the south by Salmon Creek. The community of Hockinson is situated across from the southwest portion of Venersborg.

According to the United States Census Bureau, the Venersborg CDP has a total area of 10.9 square miles (28.3 km^{2}), all of it land.

== Demographics ==
Historical population
Census	Pop.	Note	%±
2000	3,274		—
2010	3,745		14.4%
2020	3,990		6.5%
U.S. Decennial Census; 1990 2000 2010

Venersborg first appeared as a census designated place in the 2000 U.S. census.

=== Racial and ethnic composition ===
Venersborg CDP, Washington – Racial and ethnic composition Note: the US Census treats Hispanic/Latino as an ethnic category. This table excludes Latinos from the racial categories and assigns them to a separate category. Hispanics/Latinos may be of any race.
Race / Ethnicity (NH = Non-Hispanic)	Pop 2000	Pop 2010	Pop 2020	% 2000	% 2010	% 2020
White alone (NH)	3,136	3,482	3,490	95.78%	92.98%	87.47%
Black or African American alone (NH)	6	15	20	0.18%	0.40%	0.50%
Native American or Alaska Native alone (NH)	5	25	30	0.15%	0.67%	0.75%
Asian alone (NH)	14	46	41	0.43%	1.23%	1.03%
Native Hawaiian or Pacific Islander alone (NH)	2	5	13	0.06%	0.13%	0.33%
Other race alone (NH)	0	5	11	0.00%	0.13%	0.28%
Mixed race or Multiracial (NH)	50	77	210	1.53%	2.06%	5.26%
Hispanic or Latino (any race)	61	90	175	1.86%	2.40%	4.39%
Total	3,274	3,745	3,990	100.00%	100.00%	100.00%

=== 2000 census ===
As of the census of 2000, there were 3,274 people, 1,018 households, and 899 families residing in the CDP. The population density was 305.6 people per square mile (118.0/km^{2}). There were 1,054 housing units at an average density of 98.4/sq mi (38.0/km^{2}). The racial makeup of the CDP was 97.16% White, 0.18% African American, 0.15% Native American, 0.43% Asian, 0.06% Pacific Islander, 0.15% from other races, and 1.86% from two or more races. Hispanic or Latino of any race were 1.86% of the population. 23.2% were of German, 10.8% American, 10.2% English, 9.4% Finnish, 7.7% Swedish and 5.9% Irish ancestry according to Census 2000.

There were 1,018 households, out of which 43.6% had children under the age of 18 living with them, 81.1% were married couples living together, 4.6% had a female householder with no husband present, and 11.6% were non-families. 9.1% of all households were made up of individuals, and 2.7% had someone living alone who was 65 years of age or older. The average household size was 3.21 and the average family size was 3.41.

In the CDP, the age distribution of the population shows 32.7% under the age of 18, 6.5% from 18 to 24, 27.2% from 25 to 44, 27.1% from 45 to 64, and 6.6% who were 65 years of age or older. The median age was 37 years. For every 100 females, there were 103.6 males. For every 100 females age 18 and over, there were 100.7 males.

The median income for a household in the CDP was $65,912, and the median income for a family was $70,031. Males had a median income of $51,120 versus $30,806 for females. The per capita income for the CDP was $21,610. None of the families and 0.7% of the population were living below the poverty line, including no under eighteens and 5.0% of those over 64.

== Arts and culture ==
The members of the Venersborg Community Club oversee the care and maintenance of the Venersborg School, which was built in 1912. The one-room schoolhouse is on the National Register of Historic Places and the Washington State Heritage Register. It is the oldest continuously operating community building in the state of Washington. The schoolhouse is the location for several annual events including the Sweethearts' Dance in February, Spring Seed Swap & Giveaway and Spring Potluck, and the December Wreath Making party.

== Education ==
The vast majority is in the Battle Ground School District and is home to Tukes Valley primary and middle schools. A small part is in the Hockinson School District.
