= CAM Academy =

Alternative school in Washington, US

Location
- 406 NW 5th Ave; Battle Ground, Washington; Lewisville Campus; United States

Information
- Type: Alternative School
- School district: Battle Ground Public Schools
- Principal: Ryan Cowl
- Grades: 3–12
- Enrollment: 555 (2016–17)
- Slogan: Dream more, learn more, do more, become more
- Website: CAM Website

CAM Academy (Character and Academics for the Marketplace Academy) is an alternative school in the Battle Ground School District. The school offers education to students from grades 3–12. CAM Academy is located on the Lewisville Campus in Battle Ground, Washington.

== History ==
The Home-Link Technology Center was founded in 1993 as a program of the Battle Ground School District, designed to assist the many homeschooling families in the district’s boundaries. The program grew rapidly. In 1995, a spur program of the center known as the River Home-Link Technology Center opened in Camas, WA, still under the administration of the Battle Ground School District. Soon after, the programs were renamed to Battle Ground HomeLink and River HomeLink respectively.

In 1996, a sub-program of HomeLink known as "CAMLink" branched off to form a 5–12th grade school known as CAM Jr.-Sr. High School. CAM High School and Battle Ground HomeLink operated together on the same campus, as well as shared a website.

In 2011, River HomeLink was made to move from its campus in Camas to a CASEE Center office building in Brush Prairie before Battle Ground Public Schools decided to consolidate the HomeLink programs at the Maple Grove Elementary School Longhouse building in 2012. The combination of the two schools into a centralized River HomeLink program left CAM High School with full control of the Onsdorff Blvd. campus.

Soon after the consolidation, CAM constructed third and fourth-grade classrooms on the campus and officially changed its name to CAM. Academy, dropping the ‘high school’.

In 2021, Battle Ground School District’s lease on the campus expired. CAM. Academy was made to temporarily move to the Lewisville Middle School campus. By 2023, the construction of three new modular buildings for CAM Academy, near the Lewisville campus, was complete enough to begin housing the CAM student and teacher population. As of 2024, the Character and Academics for the Marketplace Academy comprises over 500 students from all over the Battle Ground region.
