= Fargher Lake, Washington =

Unincorporated community in Clark County, Washington

Fargher Lake
- Unincorporated community
- Location within the state of Washington Fargher Lake (the United States)
- Coordinates: 45°53′18″N 122°30′51″W
- Country: United States
- State: Washington
- County: Clark
- Elevation: 676 ft (206 m)
- Time zone: UTC-8 (Pacific (PST))
  - Summer (DST): UTC-7 (PDT)
- Area code: 360
- GNIS feature ID: 1504828

Fargher Lake is an unincorporated community in Clark County, Washington, United States. The community located approximately 7 mi (11 km) northwest from the town of Yacolt.

The settlement, as well as a former lake located nearby, both share the name "Fargher Lake".

== History ==
The lake was originally named Hard Hack Swamp. Brothers Arthur Wellesly, Fredrick Daniel and Horatio Albert Fargher emigrated in the 1870s from their birthland, the Isle of Man, and settled for a while near the lake.

The lake and surrounding area was renamed Fargher Lake. The water was drained sometime during the early 1960s and the lake bed was then used for farming. In the 21st century, the lake bed contains blueberry fields.
