= Battle Ground Public Schools =

School district in Washington, United States

Battle Ground School District

Address
- 11104 N.E. 149th St. Bldg. A Brush Prairie, WA 98606 Brush Prairie, Clark, Washington
- Coordinates: 45°48′N 122°30′W

District information
- Motto: Connecting every student to a successful future.
- Grades: Pre-K through 12
- Superintendent: Shelly Whitten
- Asst. superintendent(s): Lynnell Tsugawa-Murray
- Schools: 19

Other information
- Website: www.battlegroundps.org

Battle Ground Public Schools (BGPS) is a public school district in Clark County, Washington, United States. It serves the communities of Amboy, Battle Ground, Brush Prairie and Yacolt. The district headquarters are in Brush Prairie.

In 2025, voters rejected the district's attempt at replacing an expiring Educational Programs & Operations (EP&O) tax levy, resulting in approximately $14 million in cuts for the 2025–2026 school year. As of February 2026, Battle Ground Public Schools is the only district in southwest Washington to not have an EP&O levy.

== History ==
The district existed as early as 1870 as the Battle Ground School District and was eventually known as Central School District. The zone undertook the moniker of Battle Ground No. 85 when it combined with the district of Cherry Grove in 1914. A consolidation in 1955 with Glenwood, Washington led to the No. 119 designation and a further merger with Yacolt finalized the size of the Battle Ground district. However, the district currently recognizes 1909 as its year of inception and celebrated its centennial during the 2009–2010 school year.

== Boundary ==
The district includes almost all of Battle Ground. It also includes all of Brush Prairie, Cherry Grove, Dollars Corner, Lewisville, Meadow Glade, and Yacolt. Additionally, it includes most of Amboy, Mount Vista, and Venersborg, as well as parts of Duluth, Five Corners, Hockinson, Orchards, and Vancouver.

Battle Ground Public Schools is bordered by the Green Mountain, La Center, Ridgefield, Vancouver, Evergreen, and Hockinson school districts in Clark County, Washington. It also borders the Woodland in Cowlitz County and Washougal in Skamania County.

== Schools ==
As of 2025, the district includes 19 schools and one half-day alternative learning program

=== Primary schools (Gr. K-4) ===
- Captain Strong Primary School
- Daybreak Primary School
- Glenwood Heights Primary School
- Maple Grove Primary School
- Pleasant Valley Primary School
- Tukes Valley Primary School
- Yacolt Primary School

=== Middle schools (Gr. 5-8) ===
- Amboy Middle School
- Chief Umtuch Middle School
- Daybreak Middle School
- Laurin Middle School
- Pleasant Valley Middle School
- Tukes Valley Middle School

=== Comprehensive high schools ===
- Battle Ground High School
- Prairie High School, Brush Prairie

=== Alternative schools ===
- Battle Ground Virtual Academy K-12 Alternative Learning Experience
- CAM Academy 3-12 Alternative Learning Experience
- River HomeLink K-12 Alternative Learning Experience
- Summit View High School (alternative high school)
- Center for Agriculture, Science & Environmental Education (CASEE) half-day alternative learning program

=== Closed schools ===
- Battle Ground HomeLink, closed 2012
- Chief Umtuch Primary School, closed 2005
- Lewisville Middle School, closed 2009
- Maple Grove Middle School, closed 2013
- Summit View Middle School, closed 2017

Vancouver iTech Preparatory is an alternative learning program of Vancouver Public Schools, located with-in the Battle Ground boundary. Due to this overlap, 10% of the program's enrollment is reserved for Battle Ground students.

== Publications ==
=== District Publications ===
BGPS publishes an annual Report to Our Community, a yearly accountability report, designed to deliver information on district finances and programs to taxpayers.

The BGPS Bulletin is the district's monthly e-newsletter.

=== Student-led Publications ===
Battle Ground Public Schools was recognized in by local media outlets in 2026 for a resurgence in student-led journalism at a time when such programs are on a decline in the region.

Your Battle Ground Public Schools (Your BGPS) is a student-led magazine of Battle Ground Public Schools, primarily led by Tukes Valley Middle School students. The publication started as a newspaper insert of The Reflector in 2009 and ceased publication in 2013. It was revived as a student project in June 2025 by then-sixth grader Rye Geilenfeldt and the district's communications department.

The Tiger Times is the revived student newspaper of Battle Ground High School.

The Falcon Flyer is the official student news site of Prairie High School. The renewed journalism program was launched in 2022 by AP U.S. History teacher Patty Alway.

CASEE Chronicles is the official student newsletter for the Center of Agriculture, Science, and Environmental Education. Invented for the 2025–2026 school year, the publication shared its first issue in November 2025.

Student-created yearbooks are also published and printed at each high school and vary for alternative programs. Due to budget reductions, middle school yearbooks were eliminated for the 2026–27 school year.
