= Five Corners, Washington =

- Census-designated place
- Location of Five Corners, Washington
- Coordinates: 45°41′18″N 122°34′26″W
- Country: United States
- State: Washington
- County: Clark

Area
  - Total: 5.9 sq mi (15.3 km^{2})
  - Land: 5.9 sq mi (15.3 km^{2})
  - Water: 0 sq mi (0.0 km^{2})
- Elevation: 213 ft (65 m)

Population (2010)
  - Total: 18,159
  - Density: 3,076/sq mi (1,187.7/km^{2})
- Time zone: UTC-8 (Pacific (PST))
  - Summer (DST): UTC-7 (PDT)
- FIPS code: 53-24188
- GNIS feature ID: 2408214

Five Corners is a census-designated place (CDP) in Clark County, Washington, United States. The population was 20,973 at the 2020 census.

== Geography ==
Five Corners is located in southern Clark County. The community is bordered by Walnut Grove to the southwest, Barberton to the northwest, Brush Prairie to the north, Orchards to the east, and the city of Vancouver to the south. Interstate 205 forms the southwest edge of the CDP, and Washington State Route 503 forms the eastern edge. Downtown Vancouver is 8 miles (13 km) to the southwest.

According to the United States Census Bureau, the Five Corners CDP has a total area of 5.9 square miles (15.3 km^{2}), all of it land.

== Demographics ==
Historical population
Census	Pop.	Note	%±
1990	6,776		—
2000	12,207		80.2%
2010	18,159		48.8%
2020	20,973		15.5%
U.S. Decennial Census; 1970 1980 1990; 2000 2010

Five Corners first appeared as a census designated place in the 1990 U.S. census.

=== Racial and ethnic composition ===
Five Corners CDP, Washington – Racial and ethnic composition Note: the US Census treats Hispanic/Latino as an ethnic category. This table excludes Latinos from the racial categories and assigns them to a separate category. Hispanics/Latinos may be of any race.
Race / Ethnicity (NH = Non-Hispanic)	Pop 2000	Pop 2010	Pop 2020	% 2000	% 2010	% 2020
White alone (NH)	10,575	14,553	14,827	86.63%	80.14%	70.70%
Black or African American alone (NH)	195	335	487	1.60%	1.84%	2.32%
Native American or Alaska Native alone (NH)	95	133	114	0.78%	0.73%	0.54%
Asian alone (NH)	482	883	1,186	3.95%	4.86%	5.65%
Native Hawaiian or Pacific Islander alone (NH)	75	144	267	0.61%	0.79%	1.27%
Other race alone (NH)	17	28	90	0.14%	0.15%	0.43%
Mixed race or Multiracial (NH)	263	670	1,415	2.15%	3.69%	6.75%
Hispanic or Latino (any race)	505	1,413	2,587	4.14%	7.78%	12.33%
Total	12,207	18,159	20,973	100.00%	100.00%	100.00%

=== 2020 census ===
As of the 2020 census, Five Corners had a population of 20,973. The median age was 35.9 years. 25.3% of residents were under the age of 18 and 13.3% of residents were 65 years of age or older. For every 100 females there were 100.8 males, and for every 100 females age 18 and over there were 97.8 males age 18 and over.

100.0% of residents lived in urban areas, while 0.0% lived in rural areas.

There were 6,908 households in Five Corners, of which 37.5% had children under the age of 18 living in them. Of all households, 56.5% were married-couple households, 15.8% were households with a male householder and no spouse or partner present, and 19.6% were households with a female householder and no spouse or partner present. About 17.2% of all households were made up of individuals and 7.0% had someone living alone who was 65 years of age or older.

There were 7,162 housing units, of which 3.5% were vacant. The homeowner vacancy rate was 1.1% and the rental vacancy rate was 6.8%.

Racial composition as of the 2020 census
Race	Number	Percent
White	15,386	73.4%
Black or African American	508	2.4%
American Indian and Alaska Native	203	1.0%
Asian	1,209	5.8%
Native Hawaiian and Other Pacific Islander	275	1.3%
Some other race	1,141	5.4%
Two or more races	2,251	10.7%

=== 2000 census ===
As of the census of 2000, there were 12,207 people, 4,100 households, and 3,222 families residing in the CDP. The population density was 1,977.8 people per square mile (763.9/km^{2}). There were 4,306 housing units at an average density of 697.7/sq mi (269.5/km^{2}). The racial makeup of the CDP was 88.65% White, 1.65% African American, 0.88% Native American, 3.99% Asian, 0.62% Pacific Islander, 1.52% from other races, and 2.70% from two or more races. Hispanic or Latino of any race were 4.14% of the population. 19.5% were of German, 10.0% American, 9.9% English and 9.0% Irish ancestry according to Census 2000.

There were 4,100 households, out of which 40.6% had children under the age of 18 living with them, 63.5% were married couples living together, 10.3% had a female householder with no husband present, and 21.4% were non-families. 15.1% of all households were made up of individuals, and 4.0% had someone living alone who was 65 years of age or older. The average household size was 2.96 and the average family size was 3.29.

In the CDP, the age distribution of the population shows 30.2% under the age of 18, 8.0% from 18 to 24, 32.4% from 25 to 44, 23.5% from 45 to 64, and 5.9% who were 65 years of age or older. The median age was 33 years. For every 100 females, there were 99.5 males. For every 100 females age 18 and over, there were 98.5 males.

The median income for a household in the CDP was $51,688, and the median income for a family was $55,302. Males had a median income of $41,200 versus $27,630 for females. The per capita income for the CDP was $19,570. About 3.1% of families and 5.7% of the population were below the poverty line, including 5.9% of those under age 18 and 4.7% of those age 65 or over.

== Education ==
Most of the community is served by the Evergreen School District. Parts are in the Battle Ground School District.

In regards to the section in the Battle Ground district, it is zoned to Glenwood Heights Primary School, Laurin Middle School, and Prairie High School.
