= Venersborg School =

- U.S. National Register of Historic Places
- Washington Heritage Register
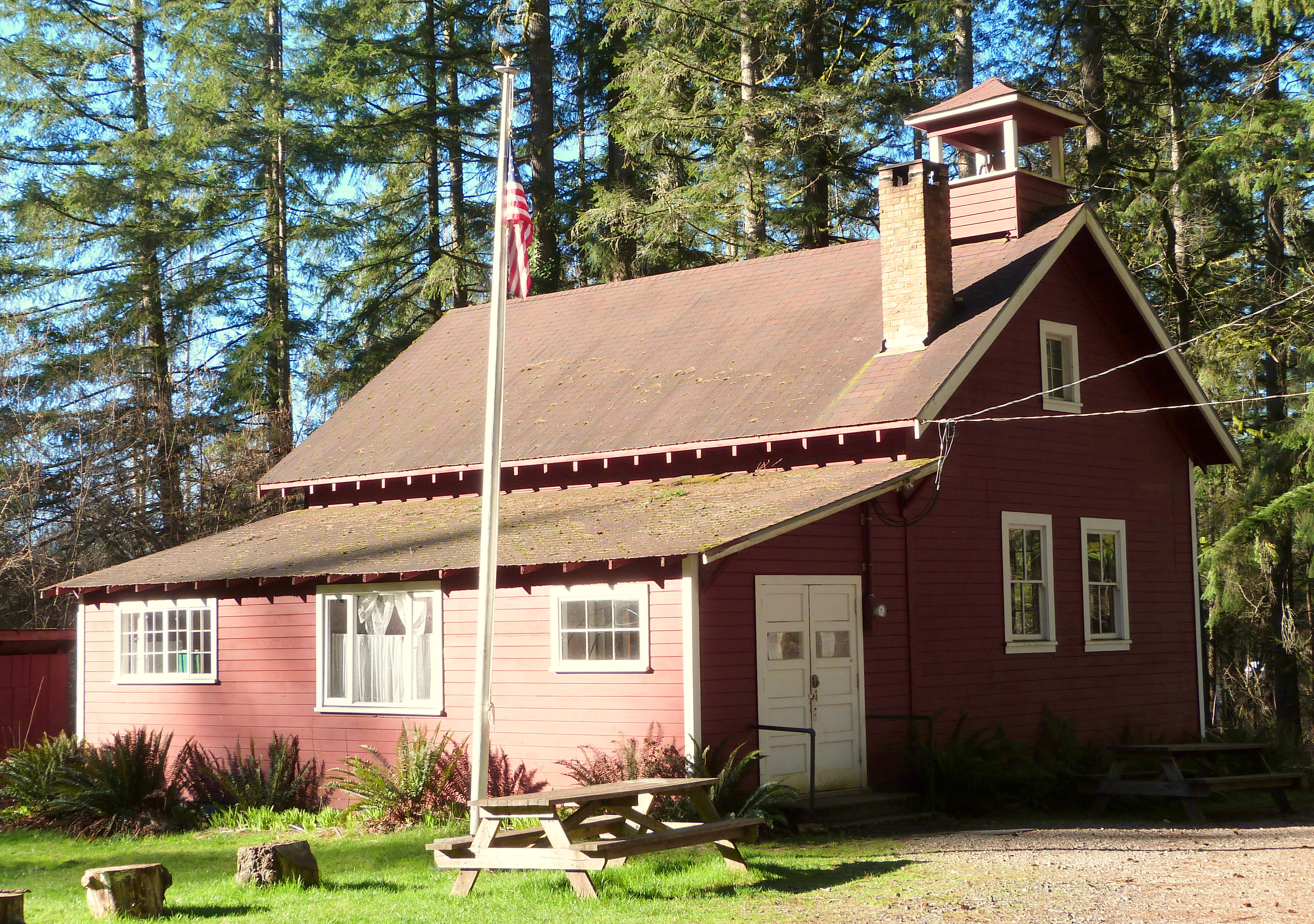
- The school's exterior, 2015

- Location within Washington (state) Location within the United States
- Location: NE 209th St. at NE 242nd Ave. Battle Ground, Washington
- Coordinates: 45°46′23″N 122°25′25″W
- Built: 1912
- Built by: John Kullberg
- Architectural style: Vernacular
- MPS: Rural Public Schools of Washington State (64500710)
- NRHP reference No.: 89000215

Significant dates
- Added to NRHP: 16 March 1989
- Designated WHR: 1989

The Venersborg School is a historic one-room school located at NE 209th Street and NE 242nd Avenue in Battle Ground, Washington.

== Description and history ==
The school is archetypical of the one room schoolhouse with its simple rectangular plan and gabled roof. The building has served the community which built it from construction to the present day.

=== Community schoolhouse ===
The small, red, one-and-one-half story gabled building with a cupola and bell was built in 1912 by John Kullberg. Kullberg, a Swedish immigrant, was a carpenter who also built a number of homes in the community and a church. The building stopped functioning as a school in 1931 when the Battle Ground school district absorbed the student population.

=== Community activity center ===
The next year it was purchased by the Venersborg Social and Athletic Club which had formed in 1915. The club was forced to discontinue its popular entertainment due to issues with crowd control. It was listed on the National Register of Historic Places on March 16, 1989. It is listed in the Washington Heritage Register as the state's oldest community center in operation. The roof was replaced by the Venersborg Historic Preservation Society in 2018, the building continues to serve as a center for community activities and a venue for wedding banquets for the church next door. The facility is managed by the Venersborg Community Club.

== See also ==
- Historic preservation
- History of education in the United States
- National Register of Historic Places listings in Clark County, Washington
