= Cherry Grove, Washington =

- Census-designated place
- Location of Cherry Grove, Washington
- Coordinates: 45°48′08″N 122°34′36″W
- Country: United States
- State: Washington
- County: Clark

Area
  - Total: 2.4 sq mi (6.3 km^{2})
  - Land: 2.4 sq mi (6.3 km^{2})
  - Water: 0 sq mi (0.0 km^{2})
- Elevation: 220 ft (67 m)

Population (2020)
  - Total: 588
  - Density: 240/sq mi (93/km^{2})
- Time zone: UTC-8 (Pacific (PST))
  - Summer (DST): UTC-7 (PDT)
- ZIP Code: 98604
- Area code(s): 360, 564
- FIPS code: 53-12015
- GNIS feature ID: 2408017

Cherry Grove is a census-designated place (CDP) in Clark County, Washington, United States. The population was 588 at the 2020 census.

== History ==
The name of Cherry Grove is linked to when plentiful wild cherry trees grew in the area. Most of the trees were planted in the 1800s, when Cherry Grove was mostly used for dairy and farming.

== Geography ==
Cherry Grove is located in central Clark County. The community is bordered to the southeast by the city of Battle Ground, to the east by Lewisville, and to the southwest by Dollars Corner.

According to the United States Census Bureau, the Cherry Grove CDP has a total area of 2.4 square miles (6.3 km^{2}), all of it land, and a reduction from the CDP's area in 2000 of 3.4 square miles (8.7 km^{2}).

== Demographics ==
Historical population
Census	Pop.	Note	%±
2000	663		—
2010	546		−17.6%
2020	588		7.7%
U.S. Decennial Census; 1990 2000 2010

Cherry Grove first appeared as a census designated place in the 2000 U.S. census.

=== Racial and ethnic composition ===
Cherry Grove CDP, Washington – Racial and ethnic composition Note: the US Census treats Hispanic/Latino as an ethnic category. This table excludes Latinos from the racial categories and assigns them to a separate category. Hispanics/Latinos may be of any race.
Race / Ethnicity (NH = Non-Hispanic)	Pop 2000	Pop 2010	Pop 2020	% 2000	% 2010	% 2020
White alone (NH)	598	499	496	90.20%	91.39%	84.35%
Black or African American alone (NH)	13	0	3	1.96%	0.00%	0.51%
Native American or Alaska Native alone (NH)	3	7	4	0.45%	1.28%	0.68%
Asian alone (NH)	1	3	7	0.15%	0.55%	1.19%
Native Hawaiian or Pacific Islander alone (NH)	0	0	0	0.00%	0.00%	0.00%
Other race alone (NH)	0	2	0	0.00%	0.37%	0.00%
Mixed race or Multiracial (NH)	13	16	43	1.96%	2.93%	7.31%
Hispanic or Latino (any race)	35	19	35	5.28%	3.48%	5.95%
Total	663	546	588	100.00%	100.00%	100.00%

=== 2000 census ===
As of the census of 2000, there were 663 people, 214 households, and 185 families residing in the CDP. The population density was 197.4 people per square mile (76.2/km^{2}). There were 227 housing units at an average density of 67.6/sq mi (26.1/km^{2}). The racial makeup of the CDP was 91.86% White, 1.96% African American, 0.45% Native American, 0.15% Asian, 3.17% from other races, and 2.41% from two or more races. Hispanic or Latino of any race were 5.28% of the population. 30.1% were of German, 17.6% American, 12.3% Finnish, 9.3% English and 6.2% Norwegian ancestry according to Census 2000.

There were 214 households, out of which 40.2% had children under the age of 18 living with them, 76.2% were married couples living together, 5.6% had a female householder with no husband present, and 13.1% were non-families. 10.3% of all households were made up of individuals, and 5.6% had someone living alone who was 65 years of age or older. The average household size was 3.10 and the average family size was 3.32.

In the CDP, the age distribution of the population shows 30.0% under the age of 18, 6.8% from 18 to 24, 26.4% from 25 to 44, 28.1% from 45 to 64, and 8.7% who were 65 years of age or older. The median age was 39 years. For every 100 females, there were 99.1 males. For every 100 females age 18 and over, there were 100.9 males.

The median income for a household in the CDP was $58,750, and the median income for a family was $64,000. Males had a median income of $40,750 versus $24,408 for females. The per capita income for the CDP was $20,760. None of the families and 1.7% of the population were living below the poverty line, including no under eighteens and none of those over 64.

== Education ==
The community is served by the Battle Ground School District.
