= Meadow Glade, Washington =

- Census-designated place
- Location of Meadow Glade, Washington
- Coordinates: 45°44′48″N 122°33′39″W
- Country: United States
- State: Washington
- County: Clark

Area
  - Total: 3.9 sq mi (10.0 km^{2})
  - Land: 3.9 sq mi (10.0 km^{2})
  - Water: 0 sq mi (0.0 km^{2})
- Elevation: 272 ft (83 m)

Population (2020)
  - Total: 2,758
  - Density: 714/sq mi (276/km^{2})
- Time zone: UTC-8 (Pacific (PST))
  - Summer (DST): UTC-7 (PDT)
- FIPS code: 53-44620
- GNIS feature ID: 2408806

Meadow Glade is a census-designated place (CDP) in Clark County, Washington, United States. The population was 2,758 at the 2020 census.

== Geography ==
Meadow Glade is located in central Clark County. The community is bordered to the northeast by the city of Battle Ground, to the southeast by Brush Prairie, and to the northwest by Dollars Corner. It is 14 miles (23 km) northeast of downtown Vancouver.

According to the United States Census Bureau, the Meadow Glade CDP has a total area of 3.9 square miles (10.0 km^{2}), all of it land.

== Demographics ==
Historical population
Census	Pop.	Note	%±
1990	1,584		—
2000	2,225		40.5%
2010	2,541		14.2%
2020	2,758		8.5%

Meadow Glade first appeared as a census designated place in the 1990 U.S. census.

=== Racial and ethnic composition ===
Meadow Glade CDP, Washington – Racial and ethnic composition Note: the US Census treats Hispanic/Latino as an ethnic category. This table excludes Latinos from the racial categories and assigns them to a separate category. Hispanics/Latinos may be of any race.
Race / Ethnicity (NH = Non-Hispanic)	Pop 1990	Pop 2000	Pop 2010	Pop 2020	% 1990	% 2000	% 2010	% 2020
White alone (NH)	1,519	2,069	2,338	2,329	95.90%	92.99%	92.01%	84.45%
Black or African American alone (NH)	0	6	6	13	0.00%	0.27%	0.24%	0.47%
Native American or Alaska Native alone (NH)	16	24	9	9	1.01%	1.08%	0.35%	0.33%
Asian alone (NH)	16	31	55	63	1.01%	1.39%	2.16%	2.28%
Native Hawaiian or Pacific Islander alone (NH)	x	6	8	6	x	0.27%	0.31%	0.22%
Other race alone (NH)	1	11	4	27	0.06%	0.49%	0.16%	0.98%
Mixed race or Multiracial (NH)	x	25	50	153	x	1.12%	1.97%	5.55%
Hispanic or Latino (any race)	32	53	71	158	2.02%	2.38%	2.79%	5.73%
Total	1,584	2,225	2,541	2,758	100.00%	100.00%	100.00%	100.00%

=== 2000 census ===
As of the census of 2000, there were 2,225 people, 695 households, and 597 families residing in the CDP. The population density was 391.7 people per square mile (151.2/km^{2}). There were 733 housing units at an average density of 129.0/sq mi (49.8/km^{2}). The racial makeup of the CDP was 94.65% White, 0.27% African American, 1.08% Native American, 1.48% Asian, 0.27% Pacific Islander, 0.99% from other races, and 1.26% from two or more races. Hispanic or Latino of any race were 2.38% of the population. 21.3% were of German, 12.2% American, 7.7% Italian, 7.5% English, 6.0% Irish and 5.8% Finnish ancestry according to Census 2000.

There were 695 households, out of which 43.0% had children under the age of 18 living with them, 76.7% were married couples living together, 6.9% had a female householder with no husband present, and 14.0% were non-families. 10.8% of all households were made up of individuals, and 5.0% had someone living alone who was 65 years of age or older. The average household size was 3.12 and the average family size was 3.35.

In the CDP, the age distribution of the population shows 29.6% under the age of 18, 6.8% from 18 to 24, 25.9% from 25 to 44, 25.3% from 45 to 64, and 12.4% who were 65 years of age or older. The median age was 37 years. For every 100 females, there were 95.3 males. For every 100 females age 18 and over, there were 94.7 males.

The median income for a household in the CDP was $67,230, and the median income for a family was $72,574. Males had a median income of $50,234 versus $27,331 for females. The per capita income for the CDP was $21,765. About 6.7% of families and 4.9% of the population were below the poverty line, including 3.0% of those under age 18 and 16.5% of those age 65 or over.

== Education ==
The community is served by the Battle Ground School District.
