= Lewisville, Washington =

- Census-designated place
- Location of Lewisville, Washington
- Coordinates: 45°48′49″N 122°30′22″W
- Country: United States
- State: Washington
- County: Clark

Area
  - Total: 5.6 sq mi (14.6 km^{2})
  - Land: 5.6 sq mi (14.5 km^{2})
  - Water: 0.039 sq mi (0.1 km^{2})
- Elevation: 614 ft (187 m)

Population (2020)
  - Total: 1,860
  - Density: 332/sq mi (128/km^{2})
- Time zone: UTC-8 (Pacific (PST))
  - Summer (DST): UTC-7 (PDT)
- ZIP Code: 98604
- Area code(s): 360, 564
- FIPS code: 53-39212
- GNIS feature ID: 2408605

Lewisville is a census-designated place (CDP) in Clark County, Washington, United States. The population was 1,860 at the 2020 census.

== Geography ==
Lewisville is located in central Clark County and is bordered to the southeast by Venersborg, to the southwest by the city of Battle Ground, and for a small distance on the west by Cherry Grove.

According to the United States Census Bureau, the Lewisville CDP has a total area of 5.6 square miles (14.6 km^{2}), of which 5.6 square miles (14.5 km^{2}) is land and 0.04 square miles (0.1 km^{2}), or 0.70%, is water.

== Demographics ==
Historical population
Census	Pop.	Note	%±
2000	1,688		—
2010	1,722		2.0%
2020	1,860		8.0%
U.S. Decennial Census; 1990 2000 2010

Lewisville first appeared as a census designated place in the 2000 U.S. census.

=== Racial and ethnic composition ===
Lewisville CDP, Washington – Racial and ethnic composition Note: the US Census treats Hispanic/Latino as an ethnic category. This table excludes Latinos from the racial categories and assigns them to a separate category. Hispanics/Latinos may be of any race.
Race / Ethnicity (NH = Non-Hispanic)	Pop 2000	Pop 2010	Pop 2020	% 2000	% 2010	% 2020
White alone (NH)	1,605	1,618	1,639	95.08%	93.96%	88.12%
Black or African American alone (NH)	4	2	11	0.24%	0.12%	0.59%
Native American or Alaska Native alone (NH)	9	11	6	0.53%	0.64%	0.32%
Asian alone (NH)	7	5	16	0.41%	0.29%	0.86%
Native Hawaiian or Pacific Islander alone (NH)	6	0	7	0.36%	0.00%	0.38%
Other race alone (NH)	12	4	7	0.71%	0.23%	0.38%
Mixed race or Multiracial (NH)	15	36	88	0.89%	2.09%	4.73%
Hispanic or Latino (any race)	30	46	86	1.78%	2.67%	4.62%
Total	1,688	1,722	1,860	100.00%	100.00%	100.00%

=== 2020 census ===
As of the 2020 census, Lewisville had a population of 1,860. The median age was 47.4 years. 23.0% of residents were under the age of 18 and 23.5% of residents were 65 years of age or older. For every 100 females there were 94.4 males, and for every 100 females age 18 and over there were 94.7 males age 18 and over.

8.3% of residents lived in urban areas, while 91.7% lived in rural areas.

There were 620 households in Lewisville, of which 30.8% had children under the age of 18 living in them. Of all households, 75.3% were married-couple households, 9.4% were households with a male householder and no spouse or partner present, and 10.6% were households with a female householder and no spouse or partner present. About 8.6% of all households were made up of individuals and 3.4% had someone living alone who was 65 years of age or older.

There were 652 housing units, of which 4.9% were vacant. The homeowner vacancy rate was 2.0% and the rental vacancy rate was 5.3%.

Racial composition as of the 2020 census
Race	Number	Percent
White	1,674	90.0%
Black or African American	11	0.6%
American Indian and Alaska Native	8	0.4%
Asian	19	1.0%
Native Hawaiian and Other Pacific Islander	9	0.5%
Some other race	18	1.0%
Two or more races	121	6.5%

=== 2000 census ===
As of the census of 2000, there were 1,688 people, 552 households, and 476 families residing in the CDP. The population density was 276.9 people per square mile (106.8/km^{2}). There were 563 housing units at an average density of 92.4/sq mi (35.6/km^{2}). The racial makeup of the CDP was 95.97% White, 0.24% African American, 0.53% Native American, 0.41% Asian, 0.36% Pacific Islander, 1.54% from other races, and 0.95% from two or more races. Hispanic or Latino of any race were 1.78% of the population. 19.5% were of German, 13.9% English, 8.2% Norwegian, 7.5% Irish, 7.5% American, 6.8% Swedish and 5.9% Finnish ancestry according to Census 2000.

There were 552 households, out of which 39.9% had children under the age of 18 living with them, 79.2% were married couples living together, 4.9% had a female householder with no husband present, and 13.6% were non-families. 10.0% of all households were made up of individuals, and 3.8% had someone living alone who was 65 years of age or older. The average household size was 3.06 and the average family size was 3.27.

In the CDP, the age distribution of the population shows 29.6% under the age of 18, 7.0% from 18 to 24, 25.1% from 25 to 44, 29.6% from 45 to 64, and 8.7% who were 65 years of age or older. The median age was 39 years. For every 100 females, there were 102.2 males. For every 100 females age 18 and over, there were 98.8 males.

The median income for a household in the CDP was $65,221, and the median income for a family was $62,031. Males had a median income of $48,816 versus $38,068 for females. The per capita income for the CDP was $23,175. About 2.0% of families and 1.1% of the population were below the poverty line, including none of those under age 18 and 9.1% of those age 65 or over.

== Education ==
The community is served by the Battle Ground School District. Lewisville shares a name with the Lewisville Campus, a closed Battle Ground school.
