= Duluth, Washington =

- Census-designated place
- Location within Washington (state)
- Coordinates: 45°46′57″N 122°38′25″W
- Country: United States
- State: Washington
- County: Clark

Area
  - Total: 6.0 sq mi (15.5 km^{2})
  - Land: 6.0 sq mi (15.5 km^{2})
  - Water: 0 sq mi (0.0 km^{2})
- Elevation: 276 ft (84 m)

Population (2020)
  - Total: 1,718
  - Density: 258/sq mi (99.8/km^{2})
- Time zone: UTC-8 (Pacific (PST))
  - Summer (DST): UTC-7 (PDT)
- ZIP Code: 98642
- Area code: 360, 564
- FIPS code: 53-18775
- GNIS feature ID: 2629757

Duluth is a census-designated place (CDP) in Clark County, Washington, United States. The population was 1,544 at the 2020 census.

The community is located 11 miles (18 km) north of downtown Vancouver, Washington, with access from Exit 11 on Interstate 5.

== History ==
Adolph Sauvie opened a store and a bus depot on 219th street and 10th avenue. The bus company wanted the place to have a name, and Adolph named it after Duluth, Minnesota, his hometown.

== Demographics ==
Historical population
Census	Pop.	Note	%±
2010	1,544		—
2020	1,718		11.3%
U.S. Decennial Census; 2000 2010 2020

Duluth first appeared as a census designated place in the 2010 U.S. census.

=== Racial and ethnic composition ===
Duluth CDP, Washington – Racial and ethnic composition Note: the US Census treats Hispanic/Latino as an ethnic category. This table excludes Latinos from the racial categories and assigns them to a separate category. Hispanics/Latinos may be of any race.
Race / Ethnicity (NH = Non-Hispanic)	Pop 2010	Pop 2020	% 2010	% 2020
White alone (NH)	1,367	1,401	88.54%	81.55%
Black or African American alone (NH)	10	2	0.65%	0.12%
Native American or Alaska Native alone (NH)	11	12	0.71%	0.70%
Asian alone (NH)	30	47	1.94%	2.74%
Native Hawaiian or Pacific Islander alone (NH)	2	0	0.13%	0.00%
Other race alone (NH)	4	9	0.26%	0.52%
Mixed race or Multiracial (NH)	33	93	2.14%	5.41%
Hispanic or Latino (any race)	87	154	5.63%	8.96%
Total	1,544	1,718	100.00%	100.00%

=== 2020 census ===
As of the 2020 census, Duluth had a population of 1,718. There were 552 households and 577 housing units in the CDP.

The median age was 45.7 years. 23.8% of residents were under the age of 18 and 20.3% were 65 years of age or older. For every 100 females there were 110.0 males, and for every 100 females age 18 and over there were 107.8 males age 18 and over.

19.3% of residents lived in urban areas, while 80.7% lived in rural areas.

There were 552 households in Duluth, of which 31.3% had children under the age of 18 living in them. Of all households, 70.8% were married-couple households, 8.7% were households with a male householder and no spouse or partner present, and 14.7% were households with a female householder and no spouse or partner present. About 10.2% of all households were made up of individuals and 5.8% had someone living alone who was 65 years of age or older.

There were 577 housing units, of which 4.3% were vacant. The homeowner vacancy rate was 0.8% and the rental vacancy rate was 1.1%.

Racial composition as of the 2020 census
Race	Number	Percent
White	1,443	84.0%
Black or African American	3	0.2%
American Indian and Alaska Native	16	0.9%
Asian	49	2.9%
Native Hawaiian and Other Pacific Islander	0	0.0%
Some other race	52	3.0%
Two or more races	155	9.0%

=== Demographic estimates ===
The ancestry in Duluth was 13.7% Irish, 12.2% English, 11.1% German, 5.4% French, 3.5% Sub-Saharan African, 2.7% Norwegian, 1.2% Italian, and 0.9% Polish.

An estimated 6.5% of the population was foreign born.

=== Income and poverty ===
The median household income was $63,981, with families having $87,625, married couples having $101,500, and non-families having $48,750. 18.9% of the population were in poverty.

== Education ==
Much of Duluth is served by Ridgefield High School in the Ridgefield School District. Parts are served by Daybreak School for K-8, and Prairie High School. in the Battle Ground School District.
