= Mary Firstenburg (fireboat) =

The Mary Firstenburg is a fireboat operated by Clark County Fire & Rescue. She was commissioned on March 16, 2014. She purchased through a FEMA Port Security Grant.

Clark County, Washington received $370,000 to help pay for the 30 feet (9.1 m) vessel. She replaces a smaller 19 feet (5.8 m) vessel. She is capable of pumping up to 2,000 gallons per minute. She is equipped with side-view sonar and an infrared optical system. Her maximum speed is 40 knots (74 km/h).

Her infrared system is useful for the fireboat to undertake search and rescue missions, to find survivors heat signatures, in addition to guiding the vessel's water cannons to the hottest burning parts of a fire.

Although the vessel, and her boathouse, were paid for through Federal grants, she was named after Mary Elizabeth Firstenburg, a local philanthropist, in recognition of previous donations to the region's non-profit enterprises.
