= Orchards, Washington =

- Census-designated place
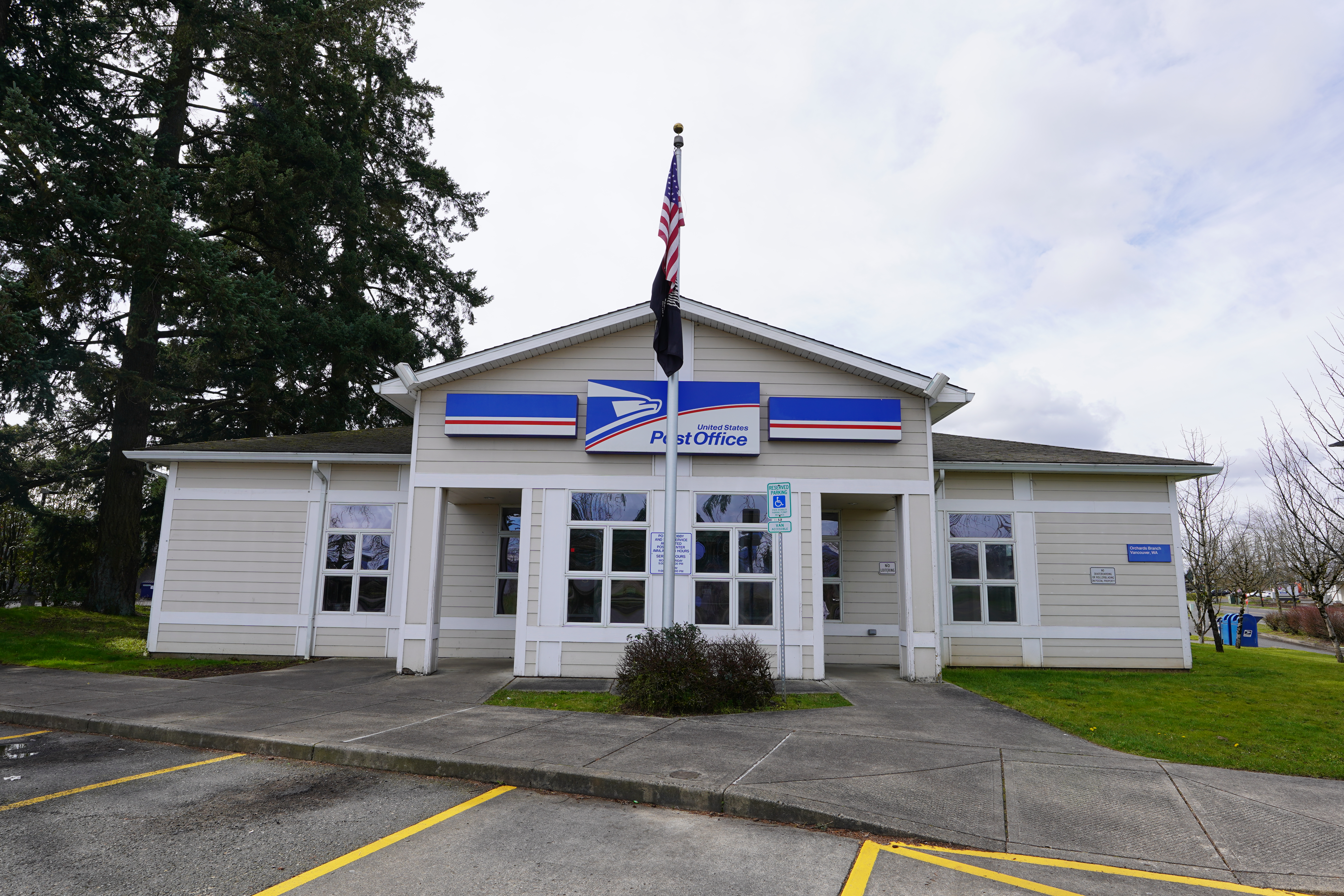
- Orchards Post Office

- Location of Orchards, Washington
- Coordinates: 45°41′25″N 122°30′52″W
- Country: United States
- State: Washington
- County: Clark

Area
  - Total: 5.4 sq mi (14.0 km^{2})
  - Land: 5.4 sq mi (14.0 km^{2})
  - Water: 0 sq mi (0.0 km^{2})
- Elevation: 272 ft (83 m)

Population (2020)
  - Total: 27,729
  - Density: 5,130/sq mi (1,980/km^{2})
- Time zone: UTC-8 (Pacific (PST))
  - Summer (DST): UTC-7 (PDT)
- ZIP Code: 98682
- Area code: 360, 564
- FIPS code: 53-51795
- GNIS feature ID: 2408998

Orchards is a census-designated place (CDP) in Clark County, Washington, United States. The population was 27,729 at the 2020 census.

== History ==
Orchards was originally known as Fourth Plain. Several theories exist as to the etymology of the name, but one account states that in 1846, Dugald McTavish, an employee of the Hudson's Bay Company, surveyed land near the fur trading post, Fort Vancouver. McTavish described four plains in the area of thick woods and officials at the trading post numbered the plains accordingly thus providing the name of the community. Wanting a more unique name, residents voted in 1904 to change the name to Orchards, after the many fruit trees in the area.

== Geography ==
Orchards is located in southern Clark County. The community is bordered to the northeast by Hockinson, to the north by Brush Prairie, to the west by Five Corners, and to the south by the city limits of Vancouver. The neighborhood of Sifton is in the southern part of the CDP.

According to the United States Census Bureau, the Orchards CDP has a total area of 5.4 square miles (14.0 km^{2}), all of it land.

== Demographics ==
Historical population
Census	Pop.	Note	%±
1980	8,828		—
1990	19,435		120.2%
2000	17,852		−8.1%
2010	19,556		9.5%
2020	27,729		41.8%
U.S. Decennial Census; 1970 1980 1990; 2000 2010; 1990 is a combination of the sum of Orchards North and Orchards South CDPs

The community first appeared as a census designated place under the name Orchards in the 1980 U.S. census. The CDP was split into the Orchards North CDP and the Orchards South CDP for the 1990 U.S. census. The community was again renamed Orchards and territory added from the deleted Orchards South CDP for the 2000 U.S. census.

=== Racial and ethnic composition ===
Orchards CDP, Washington – Racial and ethnic composition Note: the US Census treats Hispanic/Latino as an ethnic category. This table excludes Latinos from the racial categories and assigns them to a separate category. Hispanics/Latinos may be of any race.
Race / Ethnicity (NH = Non-Hispanic)	Pop 2000	Pop 2010	Pop 2020	% 2000	% 2010	% 2020
White alone (NH)	15,186	15,243	19,055	85.07%	77.95%	68.72%
Black or African American alone (NH)	304	375	700	1.70%	1.92%	2.52%
Native American or Alaska Native alone (NH)	135	147	194	0.76%	0.75%	0.70%
Asian alone (NH)	724	954	1,697	4.06%	4.88%	6.12%
Native Hawaiian or Pacific Islander alone (NH)	106	167	290	0.59%	0.85%	1.05%
Other race alone (NH)	39	57	124	0.22%	0.29%	0.45%
Mixed race or Multiracial (NH)	549	772	1,858	3.08%	3.95%	6.70%
Hispanic or Latino (any race)	809	1,841	3,811	4.53%	9.41%	13.74%
Total	17,852	19,556	27,729	100.00%	100.00%	100.00%

=== 2020 census ===
As of the 2020 census, Orchards had a population of 27,729. The median age was 34.0 years. 26.2% of residents were under the age of 18, and 10.6% were 65 years of age or older. For every 100 females there were 98.3 males, and for every 100 females age 18 and over there were 96.4 males age 18 and over.

100.0% of residents lived in urban areas, while 0.0% lived in rural areas.

There were 9,392 households in Orchards, of which 39.8% had children under the age of 18 living in them. Of all households, 54.4% were married-couple households, 15.8% were households with a male householder and no spouse or partner present, and 21.2% were households with a female householder and no spouse or partner present. About 17.7% of all households were made up of individuals and 6.0% had someone living alone who was 65 years of age or older.

There were 9,722 housing units, of which 3.4% were vacant. The homeowner vacancy rate was 0.9% and the rental vacancy rate was 5.2%.

Racial composition as of the 2020 census
Race	Number	Percent
White	19,950	71.9%
Black or African American	715	2.6%
American Indian and Alaska Native	321	1.2%
Asian	1,720	6.2%
Native Hawaiian and Other Pacific Islander	305	1.1%
Some other race	1,719	6.2%
Two or more races	2,999	10.8%

=== 2000 census ===
As of the census of 2000, there were 17,852 people, 5,918 households, and 4,704 families residing in the CDP. The population density was 2,601.4 people per square mile (1,004.8/km^{2}). There were 6,175 housing units at an average density of 899.8/sq mi (347.5/km^{2}). The racial makeup of the CDP was 87.39% White, 1.75% African American, 0.88% Native American, 4.11% Asian, 0.59% Pacific Islander, 1.84% from other races, and 3.44% from two or more races. Hispanic or Latino of any race were 4.53% of the population. 19.9% were of German, 9.3% Irish, 8.8% American and 6.6% English ancestry according to Census 2000.

There were 5,918 households, out of which 49.6% had children under the age of 18 living with them, 62.4% were married couples living together, 11.1% had a female householder with no husband present, and 20.5% were non-families. 14.3% of all households were made up of individuals, and 2.6% had someone living alone who was 65 years of age or older. The average household size was 3.02 and the average family size was 3.34.

In the CDP, the age distribution of the population shows 34.2% under the age of 18, 8.3% from 18 to 24, 36.9% from 25 to 44, 16.5% from 45 to 64, and 4.1% who were 65 years of age or older. The median age was 29 years. For every 100 females, there were 99.8 males. For every 100 females age 18 and over, there were 99.2 males.

The median income for a household in the CDP was $49,216, and the median income for a family was $50,330. Males had a median income of $37,716 versus $26,576 for females. The per capita income for the CDP was $17,866. About 4.6% of families and 6.7% of the population were below the poverty line, including 9.1% of those under the age of 18 and 6.9% of those age 65 or over.

== Education ==
Most of the community is served by the Evergreen School District. Parts are in the Battle Ground School District and in the Hockinson School District.
