= Hockinson, Washington =

- Census-designated place
- Location of Hockinson, Washington
- Coordinates: 45°44′20″N 122°29′22″W
- Country: United States
- State: Washington
- County: Clark

Area
  - Total: 14.0 sq mi (36.3 km^{2})
  - Land: 14.0 sq mi (36.3 km^{2})
  - Water: 0 sq mi (0.0 km^{2})
- Elevation: 387 ft (118 m)

Population (2020)
  - Total: 6,105
  - Density: 436/sq mi (168/km^{2})
- Time zone: UTC-8 (Pacific (PST))
  - Summer (DST): UTC-7 (PDT)
- FIPS code: 53-31530
- GNIS feature ID: 2408394

Hockinson is a census-designated place (CDP) in Clark County, Washington, United States. The population was 6,105 at the 2020 census.

Based on per capita income, one of the more reliable measures of affluence, Hockinson ranks 86th of 522 areas in the state of Washington to be ranked.

== Geography ==
Hockinson is located near the center of Clark County. The community is bordered to the north by Venersborg, to the northwest by the city of Battle Ground, to the west by Brush Prairie, and to the southwest by Orchards. It is 14 miles (23 km) northeast of downtown Vancouver.

According to the United States Census Bureau, the Hockinson CDP has a total area of 14.0 square miles (36.3 km^{2}), all land.

== Demographics ==
Historical population
Census	Pop.	Note	%±
2000	5,136		—
2010	4,771		−7.1%
2020	6,105		28.0%
U.S. Decennial Census; 1990 2000 2010

Hockinson first appeared as a census designated place in the 2000 U.S. census.

=== Racial and ethnic composition ===
Hockinson CDP, Washington – Racial and ethnic composition Note: the US Census treats Hispanic/Latino as an ethnic category. This table excludes Latinos from the racial categories and assigns them to a separate category. Hispanics/Latinos may be of any race.
Race / Ethnicity (NH = Non-Hispanic)	Pop 2000	Pop 2010	Pop 2020	% 2000	% 2010	% 2020
White alone (NH)	4,890	4,407	5,204	95.21%	92.37%	85.24%
Black or African American alone (NH)	15	19	32	0.29%	0.40%	0.52%
Native American or Alaska Native alone (NH)	24	26	24	0.47%	0.54%	0.39%
Asian alone (NH)	33	53	162	0.64%	1.11%	2.65%
Native Hawaiian or Pacific Islander alone (NH)	10	4	13	0.19%	0.08%	0.21%
Other race alone (NH)	6	4	37	0.12%	0.08%	0.61%
Mixed race or Multiracial (NH)	75	93	335	1.46%	1.95%	5.49%
Hispanic or Latino (any race)	83	165	298	1.62%	3.46%	4.88%
Total	5,136	4,771	6,105	100.00%	100.00%	100.00%

=== 2000 census ===
As of the census of 2000, there were 5,136 people, 1,592 households, and 1,385 families residing in the CDP. The population density was 308.5/mi^{2} (119.1/km^{2}). There were 1,647 housing units at an average density of 98.9/mi^{2} (38.2/km^{2}). The racial makeup of the CDP was 95.97% White, 0.29% African American, 0.47% Native American, 0.64% Asian, 0.19% Pacific Islander, 0.68% from other races, and 1.75% from two or more races. Hispanic or Latino of any race were 1.62% of the population. 16.9% were of German, 14.9% English, 9.9% Irish, 7.3% American, 5.6% Finnish and 5.1% Norwegian ancestry according to Census 2000.

There were 1,592 households, out of which 46.0% had children under the age of 18 living with them, 79.7% were married couples living together, 4.8% had a female householder with no husband present, and 13.0% were non-families. 9.8% of all households were made up of individuals, and 3.4% had someone living alone who was 65 years of age or older. The average household size was 3.23 and the average family size was 3.46.

In the CDP, the age distribution of the population shows 32.9% under the age of 18, 6.8% from 18 to 24, 25.5% from 25 to 44, 28.5% from 45 to 64, and 6.3% who were 65 years of age or older. The median age was 37 years. For every 100 females, there were 104.5 males. For every 100 females age 18 and over, there were 101.1 males.

The median income for a household in the CDP was $69,757, and the median income for a family was $72,292. Males had a median income of $50,570 versus $34,901 for females. The per capita income for the CDP was $25,269. About 1.7% of families and 2.2% of the population were below the poverty line, including 2.8% of those under age 18 and none of those age 65 or over.

== Arts and culture ==
=== Historic buildings and sites ===
The Elim Lutheran Church was built beginning in 1893 with a dedication held in 1899. The land was donated by Ambrosius Hokensen, whose log home was used when the congregation first began in 1884. A bell tower was added in 1907 and an expansion of the building was done in 1952. Over its history, the church has been used as a post office and hosted events tied to Hockinson Fun Days.

== Education ==
Most of the community is served by the Hockinson School District. Parts are in the Battle Ground School District.
