= Hall, Washington =

Unincorporated community in Clark County, Washington

Hall
- Unincorporated community
- Location within the state of Washington Hall (the United States)
- Coordinates: 45°56′54″N 122°32′22″W
- Country: United States
- State: Washington
- County: Clark
- Elevation: 682 ft (208 m)
- Time zone: UTC-8 (Pacific (PST))
  - Summer (DST): UTC-7 (PDT)
- Area code: 360
- GNIS feature ID: 1513999

Hall is an unincorporated community in Clark County, in the U.S. state of Washington.

== History ==
A post office named Hall was established in 1906, and remained in operation until 1934. The community was named after James F. Hall, the original owner of the town site.
