= Etna, Washington =

Unincorporated community in Clark County, Washington

- Unincorporated community
- Location within Washington (state) Location within the United States
- Coordinates: 45°56′17″N 122°35′54″W
- Country: United States
- State: Washington
- County: Clark
- Elevation: 322 ft (98 m)
- Time zone: UTC-8 (Pacific (PST))
  - Summer (DST): UTC-7 (PDT)
- GNIS feature ID: 1510952

Etna is an unincorporated community in Clark County, Washington.

== History ==
A post office called Etna was established in 1882, and remained in operation until 1918. The name is a transfer from Etna Green, Indiana.
