= Maddox Industrial Transformer =

American transformer manufacturer

Coordinates: 45.7687°N 122.5228°W

- Type: Private
- Industry: Electrical components
- Founded: 2015
- Founder: Camden Spiller
- Headquarters: Battle Ground, Washington, U.S.
- Number of locations: 8
- Area served: United States
- Key people: Camden Spiller (CEO)
- Products: Transformers Switchgears
- Number of employees: 400+
- Website: www.maddox.com

Maddox Industrial Transformer is an American company which manufactures transformers. It was founded in 2015 and has over 400 employees. Maddox is based in Battle Ground, Washington and has locations in Washington State, Idaho, Ohio, Texas, South Carolina, and Tennessee. The CEO is Camden Spiller.

For the last seven years, Maddox has made the Inc. 5000 list for the fastest growing companies in the United States.

As well as manufacturing transformers, Maddox also repairs and remanufactures old transformers.
