= Proebstel, Washington =

Unincorporated community in Clark County, Washington

Proebstel
- Unincorporated community
- Location within the state of Washington Proebstel (the United States)
- Coordinates: 45°40′07″N 122°28′54″W
- Country: United States
- State: Washington
- County: Clark
- Elevation: 230 ft (70 m)
- Time zone: UTC-8 (Pacific (PST))
  - Summer (DST): UTC-7 (PDT)
- Area code: 360
- GNIS feature ID: 1524654

Proebstel is an unincorporated community in Clark County, in the U.S. state of Washington.

== History ==
A post office called Proebstel was established in 1886, and remained in operation until 1907. The community was named after John Proebstel, an early settler.
