= Brush Prairie, Washington =

- Census-designated place
- Location of Brush Prairie, Washington
- Coordinates: 45°44′15″N 122°32′12″W
- Country: United States
- State: Washington
- County: Clark

Area
  - Total: 7.8 sq mi (20.3 km^{2})
  - Land: 7.8 sq mi (20.3 km^{2})
  - Water: 0 sq mi (0.0 km^{2})
- Elevation: 292 ft (89 m)

Population (2010)
  - Total: 2,652
  - Density: 337/sq mi (130.3/km^{2})
- Time zone: UTC-8 (Pacific (PST))
  - Summer (DST): UTC-7 (PDT)
- ZIP Code: 98606
- Area code: 360, 564
- FIPS code: 53-08465
- GNIS feature ID: 2407913

Brush Prairie is a census-designated place (CDP) in Clark County, Washington, United States. The population was 2,738 at the 2020 census, up from 2,384 at the 2000 census.

Based on per capita income, one of the more reliable measures of affluence, Brush Prairie ranks 57th of 522 areas in the state of Washington to be ranked.

The area is mostly covered by Battle Ground Public Schools, with a small part going to Hockinson School District.

== History ==
A post office called Brush Prairie has been in operation since 1871. The community was named by Elmarine Jane Bowman for a brushy prairie and swamp on her father's homestead.

== Geography ==
Brush Prairie is located southwest of the center of Clark County. The community is bordered by Meadow Glade and Battle Ground to the north, Hockinson to the east, Orchards and Five Corners to the south, and Barberton to the west. Washington State Route 503 passes through the community, leading north 4 miles (6 km) to the center of Battle Ground and south 5 miles (8 km) to the start of the SR 500 freeway at the northern border of Vancouver.

According to the United States Census Bureau, the Brush Prairie CDP has a total area of 7.8 square miles (20.3 km^{2}), all of it land.

== Demographics ==
Historical population
Census	Pop.	Note	%±
1990	2,650		—
2000	2,384		−10.0%
2010	2,652		11.2%
2020	2,749		3.7%
U.S. Decennial Census

Brush Prairie first appeared as a census designated place in the 1990 U.S. census.

=== Racial and ethnic composition ===
Brush Prairie CDP, Washington – Racial and ethnic composition Note: the US Census treats Hispanic/Latino as an ethnic category. This table excludes Latinos from the racial categories and assigns them to a separate category. Hispanics/Latinos may be of any race.
Race / Ethnicity (NH = Non-Hispanic)	Pop 2000	Pop 2010	Pop 2020	% 2000	% 2010	% 2020
White alone (NH)	2,264	2,445	2,336	94.97%	92.19%	84.98%
Black or African American alone (NH)	5	16	4	0.21%	0.60%	0.15%
Native American or Alaska Native alone (NH)	7	16	23	0.29%	0.60%	0.84%
Asian alone (NH)	17	30	27	0.71%	1.13%	0.98%
Native Hawaiian or Pacific Islander alone (NH)	5	10	11	0.21%	0.38%	0.40%
Other race alone (NH)	3	1	7	0.13%	0.04%	0.25%
Mixed race or Multiracial (NH)	43	38	132	1.80%	1.43%	4.80%
Hispanic or Latino (any race)	40	96	209	1.68%	3.62%	7.60%
Total	2,384	2,652	2,749	100.00%	100.00%	100.00%

=== 2000 census ===
As of the census of 2000, there were 2,384 people, 868 households, and 671 families residing in the CDP. The population density was 304.8 people per square mile (117.7 people/km^{2}). There were 902 housing units at an average density of 115.3 per square mile (44.5/km^{2}). The racial makeup of the CDP was 96.14% White, 0.21% African American, 0.29% Native American, 0.71% Asian, 0.21% Pacific Islander, 0.59% from other races, and 1.85% from two or more races. Hispanic or Latino of any race were 1.68% of the population. 21.0% were of German, 8.9% United States or American, 8.7% Irish, 8.4% Norwegian, 6.8% English and 6.7% French ancestry according to Census 2000. 97.5% spoke English and 2.5% Spanish as their first language.

There were 868 households, out of which 32.1% had children under the age of 18 living with them, 68.3% were married couples living together, 6.6% had a female householder with no husband present, and 22.6% were non-families. 18.4% of all households were made up of individuals, and 7.3% had someone living alone who was 65 years of age or older. The average household size was 2.74 and the average family size was 3.11.

In the CDP, the age distribution of the population shows 26.6% under the age of 18, 6.5% from 18 to 24, 24.0% from 25 to 44, 31.8% from 45 to 64, and 11.0% who were 65 years of age or older. The median age was 41 years. For every 100 females, there were 98.3 males. For every 100 females age 18 and over, there were 96.9 males.

The median income for a household in the CDP was $59,408, and the median income for a family was $71,793. Males had a median income of $47,708 versus $40,533 for females. The per capita income for the CDP was $27,605. About 2.4% of families and 3.9% of the population were below the poverty line, including 5.0% of those under age 18 and 6.2% of those age 65 or over.

== Notable people ==
- Dan Dickau, former NBA basketball player
- Gary Gray, actor
- Jon Heder, actor
- Zia McCabe, keyboardist for the rock band The Dandy Warhols
- Richie Sexson, Major League Baseball first baseman
- Gerry Staley, Major League Baseball pitcher
