= Yacolt, Washington =

Town in Clark County, Washington

Yacolt
- Town
- Yacolt, Washington
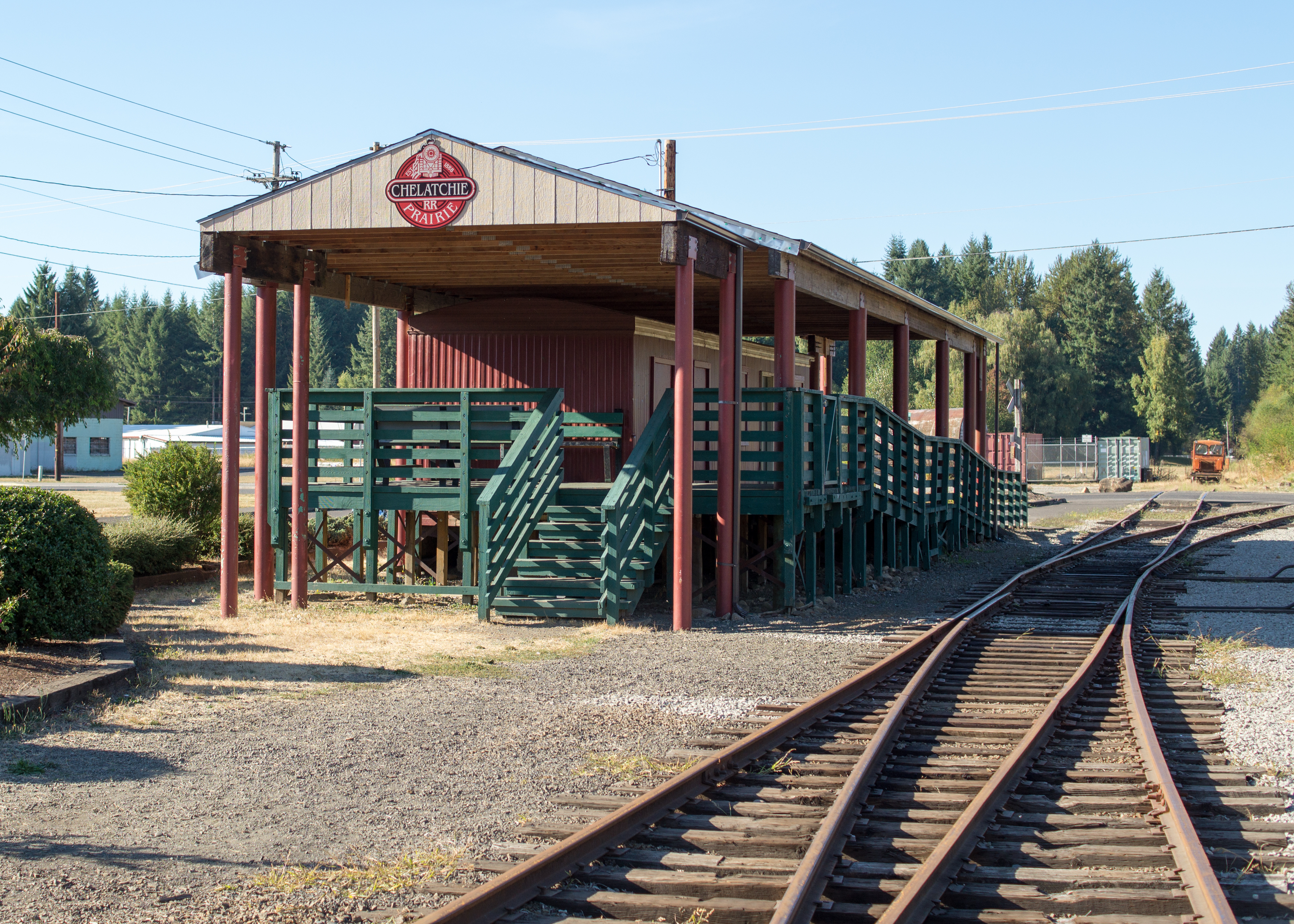
- Chelatchie Prairie Railroad station in Yacolt

- Location of Yacolt, Washington
- Coordinates: 45°51′55″N 122°24′23″W
- Country: United States
- State: Washington
- County: Clark

Government
  - Mayor: Katie Listek

Area
  - Total: 0.58 sq mi (1.49 km^{2})
  - Land: 0.58 sq mi (1.49 km^{2})
  - Water: 0 sq mi (0.00 km^{2})
- Elevation: 709 ft (216 m)

Population (2020)
  - Total: 1,668
  - Estimate (2023): 1,626
  - Density: 2,900/sq mi (1,120/km^{2})
- Time zone: UTC-8 (Pacific (PST))
  - Summer (DST): UTC-7 (PDT)
- ZIP Code: 98675
- Area code(s): 360, 564
- FIPS code: 53-79975
- GNIS feature ID: 2413517
- Website: Town of Yacolt

Yacolt /ˈjækoʊlt/ is a town in Clark County, Washington, United States. The 2023 population is estimated to be 1,626. It is located about 30 miles (48 km) northeast of Vancouver which is part of the Portland-Vancouver metropolitan area.

== History ==
Yacolt is derived from the Klickitat word "Yahkohtl," meaning "haunted place" or "place of (evil) spirits." The area was also known as "the valley of lost children". In September 1902 the town, which consisted of only 15 buildings at the time, was nearly destroyed by the Yacolt Burn, the largest fire in state history. Yacolt was rebuilt over time and officially incorporated on July 31, 1908.

== Geography ==
According to the United States Census Bureau, the town has a total area of 0.50 square miles (1.29 km^{2}), all of it land.

== Demographics ==
Historical population
Census	Pop.	Note	%±
1910	435		—
1920	520		19.5%
1930	295		−43.3%
1940	297		0.7%
1950	411		38.4%
1960	375		−8.8%
1970	488		30.1%
1980	544		11.5%
1990	600		10.3%
2000	1,055		75.8%
2010	1,566		48.4%
2020	1,668		6.5%
2023 (est.)	1,626	▼	−2.5%
U.S. Decennial Census; 2023 Estimate

=== 2020 census ===
As of the 2020 census, Yacolt had a population of 1,668. The median age was 28.3 years. 32.9% of residents were under the age of 18 and 8.3% of residents were 65 years of age or older. For every 100 females there were 100.0 males, and for every 100 females age 18 and over there were 102.0 males age 18 and over.

0.0% of residents lived in urban areas, while 100.0% lived in rural areas.

There were 523 households in Yacolt, of which 48.2% had children under the age of 18 living in them. Of all households, 63.5% were married-couple households, 13.6% were households with a male householder and no spouse or partner present, and 17.2% were households with a female householder and no spouse or partner present. About 15.1% of all households were made up of individuals and 3.0% had someone living alone who was 65 years of age or older.

There were 541 housing units, of which 3.3% were vacant. The homeowner vacancy rate was 1.1% and the rental vacancy rate was 4.2%.

Racial composition as of the 2020 census
Race	Number	Percent
White	1,531	91.8%
Black or African American	0	0.0%
American Indian and Alaska Native	6	0.4%
Asian	2	0.1%
Native Hawaiian and Other Pacific Islander	0	0.0%
Some other race	16	1.0%
Two or more races	113	6.8%
Hispanic or Latino (of any race)	60	3.6%

=== 2010 census ===
As of the 2010 census, there were 1,566 people, 454 households, and 384 families living in the town. The population density was 3,132.0 inhabitants per square mile (1,209.3/km^{2}). There were 484 housing units at an average density of 968.0 per square mile (373.7/km^{2}). The racial makeup of the town was 95.8% White, 0.5% African American, 1.1% Native American, 0.4% Asian, 0.2% from other races, and 2.0% from two or more races. Hispanic or Latino of any race were 2.1% of the population.

There were 454 households, of which 55.3% had children under the age of 18 living with them, 68.3% were married couples living together, 8.4% had a female householder with no husband present, 7.9% had a male householder with no wife present, and 15.4% were non-families. 10.8% of all households were made up of individuals, and 3.7% had someone living alone who was 65 years of age or older. The average household size was 3.45 and the average family size was 3.68.

The median age in the town was 25 years. 38.6% of residents were under the age of 18; 11.4% were between the ages of 18 and 24; 27.9% were from 25 to 44; 17% were from 45 to 64; and 5% were 65 years of age or older. The gender makeup of the town was 50.9% male and 49.1% female.

=== 2000 census ===
As of the 2000 census, there were 1,055 people, 319 households, and 256 families living in the town. The population density was 2,075.2 people per square mile (798.7/km^{2}). There were 344 housing units at an average density of 676.7 per square mile (260.4/km^{2}). The racial makeup of the town was 95.26% White, 0.47% African American, 1.14% Native American, 0.38% Asian, 0.09% from other races, and 2.65% from two or more races. Hispanic or Latino of any race were 1.90% of the population. 22.1% were of American, 17.9% German, 8.6% English, 7.0% Norwegian, and 5.2% Irish ancestry.

There were 319 households, out of which 54.5% had children under the age of 18 living with them, 63.9% were married couples living together, 11.6% had a female householder with no husband present, and 19.7% were non-families. 16.0% of all households were made up of individuals, and 6.3% had someone living alone who was 65 years of age or older. The average household size was 3.31 and the average family size was 3.71.

In the town, the population was spread out, with 40.2% under the age of 18, 8.2% from 18 to 24, 30.6% from 25 to 44, 13.4% from 45 to 64, and 7.6% who were 65 years of age or older. The median age was 26 years. For every 100 females, there were 106.9 males. For every 100 females age 18 and over, there were 99.7 males.

The median income for a household in the town was $39,444, and the median income for a family was $43,438. Males had a median income of $37,500 versus $24,306 for females. The per capita income for the town was $12,529. About 6.4% of families and 7.8% of the population were below the poverty line, including 8.8% of those under age 18 and 11.1% of those age 65 or over.

== Parks and recreation ==
The Chelatchie Prairie Railroad, a train ride excursion organization, is based in Yacolt. The railroad uses tracks built near the turn of the 20th century that eventually went into disuse in 1984. Restoration efforts in the 1990s led to the creation of the Chelatchie Prairie Railroad program in 2001. Hosting events tied to holidays throughout the year, such as the Headless Horseman Train Ride during the Halloween season, the railroad is best known for its Christmas Train Ride (also known as the Santa Train), an annual event that traverses 13.0 miles (20.9 km) through the mountainous area bringing riders to Yacolt Falls, a rock tunnel, and Moulton Station. The diesel train, a 1941 ALCO S2, pulls passenger cars originally built between from the 1910s into the 1920s.

== Education ==
Yacolt is located in the Battle Ground Public Schools district. The only public school located in Yacolt is Yacolt Primary School.

Yacolt is zoned to Yacolt Primary, Amboy Middle School, and Battle Ground High School.

== Notable people ==
- Tonya Harding, figure skater
- Joe Kent, former United States Army officer and political candidate. As of July 31, 2025, Joe is the Director of the National Counterterrorism Center.
