= Hockinson School District =

School district in Washington, United States

- 17912 NE 159th St, Brush Prairie, Washington 98606

District information
- Motto: Preparing all students for lifelong success
- Established: 1870
- Superintendent: Steve Marshall

Students and staff
- Students: 2,100

Other information
- Website: www.hocksd.org

Hockinson School District (HSD) is a public school district in Clark County, Washington, United States. It serves the community of Hockinson, Washington. The district headquarters is located in Brush Prairie.

As of the 2024–2025 school year, Hockinson School District has an enrollment of 2,100 full-time students.

== History ==
The Hockinson School District was established in 1870 in the community of Eureka, later renamed Hockinson, with its first school opening in 1873. Over the following decades, the district expanded through the consolidation of several rural schools, including Fifth Plain in 1929, Salmon Falls in 1931, and Mountain View in 1938.

== Boundary ==
The district includes almost all of Hockinson. It also includes part of Venersborg, Battle Ground, Brush Prairie, and Orchards.

== Schools ==
Hockinson School District comprises three schools and one virtual academy.

- Hockinson Heights Elementary School (TK – 5th Grade)
- Hockinson Middle School (6th Grade – 8th Grade)
- Hockinson High School (9th Grade – 12th Grade)
- Hockinson Virtual Academy (6th Grade – 12th Grade)
