= Prairie High School (Washington) =

Coordinates: 45°42′17″N 122°33′18″W

Location
- 11311 NE 119th St; Brush Prairie, Washington 98662; United States

Information
- Type: Public
- Established: 1979
- Principal: Susannah Woehr
- Staff: 79.70 (FTE)
- Student to teacher ratio: 19.21
- Colors: Crimson and Gold
- Mascot: Falcon
- Rival: Battle Ground High School
- Website: phs.battlegroundps.org

Prairie High School is a high school in Brush Prairie, Washington, United States. Built in 1979, it is part of the Battle Ground School District of public schools in Clark County, located in the southwest region of the state.

== Sports ==
Prairie is a member of the Washington Interscholastic Athletics Association (WIAA) and a participant in the Greater St. Helens 3A league.

The following teams have won state championships:

- Baseball: 1986, 1989
- Bowling: 2011
- Girls' basketball: 1993, 1994, 1998, 1999, 2003, 2012, 2019
- Girls' golf: 1993
- Softball: 2000, 2006
- Volleyball: 1998, 2012

== Notable alumni ==
- Lance Bade, Olympic bronze medalist in trap shooting 1996
- Jaime Herrera Beutler, former congresswoman
- Dan Dickau, played in the NBA for several teams
- Alan Embree, MLB pitcher with the Colorado Rockies, Boston Red Sox and several other teams.
- Ana Matronic, born Anna Lynch, of the Scissor Sisters
- Richie Sexson, MLB, played for the Cleveland Indians and Seattle Mariners
- Grant Sitton, basketball player
- Zak Hill, offensive coordinator for Arizona State University
- Jordan Chiles, two-time (2020, 2024) Olympic gymnast
