= River HomeLink =

Coordinates: 45.7670°N 122.5446°W

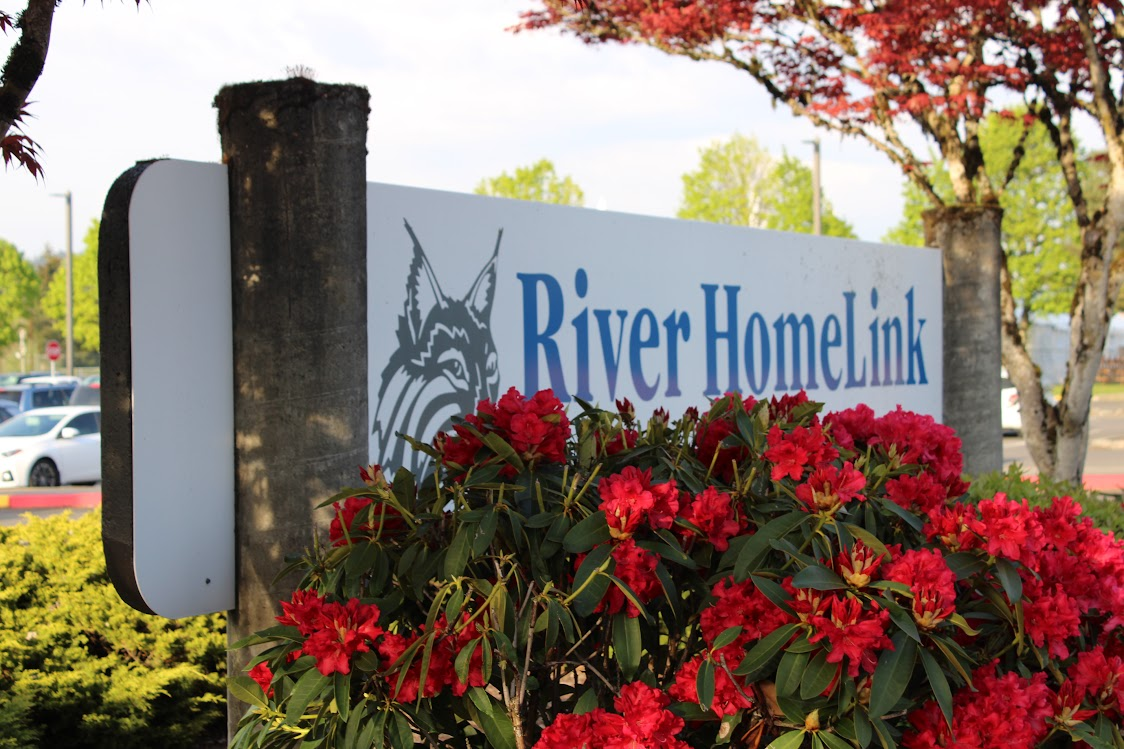
- 610A SW Eaton Blvd; Battle Ground, Washington

Information
- Former names: Home-Link Technology Center, River Home-Link Technology Center, Battle Ground HomeLink
- School type: Public Alternative Learning Experience (K-12)
- Established: 1993, 1995
- School district: Battle Ground School District
- Principal: Matt Kesler
- Grades: K to 12
- Campus: Maple Grove School Campus
- Mascot: Lynx
- Nickname: RHL, River
- Yearbook: https://sites.google.com/battlegroundps.org/rhl-yearbook

River HomeLink is an alternative K-12 school located in Battle Ground, Washington, and is known for allowing a student's parents to participate in class activities, as well as providing a mix between traditional school practices and home school. It has over 1,000 students from around the Clark County area. The school was identified as a site of public exposure during a 2019 measles outbreak, with the public being exposed to the vaccine-preventable illness Jan. 8–9, 2019, which forced the schools to close and the children to go home.

== History ==
In 1993, two educators, Gary Albers and Larry Pierson came together to form an alternative learning program built for the district's homeschooling families known as ‘Home-Link Technology Center’. The program operated out of an office building on the leased CASEE Center campus in Brush Prairie. Soon after the opening of the program, a group of families, based mainly in the Camas-Washougal area, began to show interest in the technology center, but they could not justify driving to and from Brush Prairie each day. In 1994, Larry Pierson decided to help the coalition in their mission to form a similar program closer to home. Battle Ground School District originally denied the group, however, after they were rejected by six other school districts, Battle Ground decided to sponsor the program.

In 1995, the River Home-Link Technology Center opened in Camas. The program operated out of a leased space in the basement of the Camas Church of the Nazareth. The program was successful and attracted families from all over the southern Clark County area.

In 1996, a program of the Brush Prairie location known as ‘CAMLink’ broke off to establish its own high school, and the two moved to a campus leased from Gary Albers. The same year, the original center was renamed to ‘Battle Ground HomeLink’ and the Camas location was renamed to ‘River HomeLink'.

Battle Ground and River HomeLink spent nearly a decade growing their populations and communities. However, in 2009, with budget cuts from the state hitting hard, Battle Ground School District made the controversial decision to move River HomeLink from Camas to a building on the CASEE Center campus in Brush Prairie. The population of River HomeLink dropped from around 530 to less than 200, many staff members were laid off as well. In 2011, River HomeLink was moved from the CASEE Center to share a building with Battle Ground HomeLink and CAM High School on the leased church campus. The two schools cohabitated until 2011, when the district made the again controversial, decision to consolidate the HomeLink programs into one.

The next school year, Battle Ground HomeLink was absorbed into the River program, and the unified HomeLink was moved to the old Maple Grove Elementary School’s ‘Longhouse’ building.

In 2014, River HomeLink opened ‘OnlineLink’ or ‘River Online Learning’ as an online alternative for students. The sub-program grew gradually until it took off in 2019. In 2023, River Online broke off to form ‘Battle Ground Virtual Academy’, Battle Ground School District’s first fully online ALE program. Now, Battle Ground Virtual Academy has a population of over 530 students, and the River HomeLink population is over 1,000.

== 30th anniversary ==
On January 30, 2024, staff and students, current and former, assembled to celebrate the thirtieth anniversary since opening of the Home-Link Technology Center.

== BGPS Official Links ==
- Official website
