= Ridgefield School District (Washington) =

School district in Washington state, US

Location
- 510 Pioneer St. Ridgefield, WA 98642 United States

District information
- Type: Public
- Motto: Together We Grow
- Grades: K-12
- Schools: 5

Students and staff
- Students: 4,3297 (2024–25)
- Teachers: 225.53 (on an FTE basis)

Other information
- Website: https://www.ridgefieldsd.org/

The Ridgefield School District is the school district which serves to operate the public primary and secondary schools from the Ridgefield area, in Clark County, Washington, United States.

The district's main office is located next to the Ridgefield High School, approximately 1 mile (1.6 km) south of downtown Ridgefield.

The district includes Ridgefield, most of Duluth, and a part of Mount Vista.

== Schools ==
=== Secondary ===
- Ridgefield High School (grades 9–12)
- View Ridge Middle School (grades 7–8)
- Wisdom Ridge Academy (grades K–12)

=== Intermediate ===
- Sunset Ridge Intermediate School (grades 5–6)

=== Elementary ===
- South Ridge Elementary School (grades K–4)
- Sunset Ridge Elementary School (grades K-4)
- Union Ridge Elementary School (grades K–4)

=== Preschool ===
- Ridgefield Early Learning Center (PK)
