= Clark County, Washington =

County in Washington, United States

- County
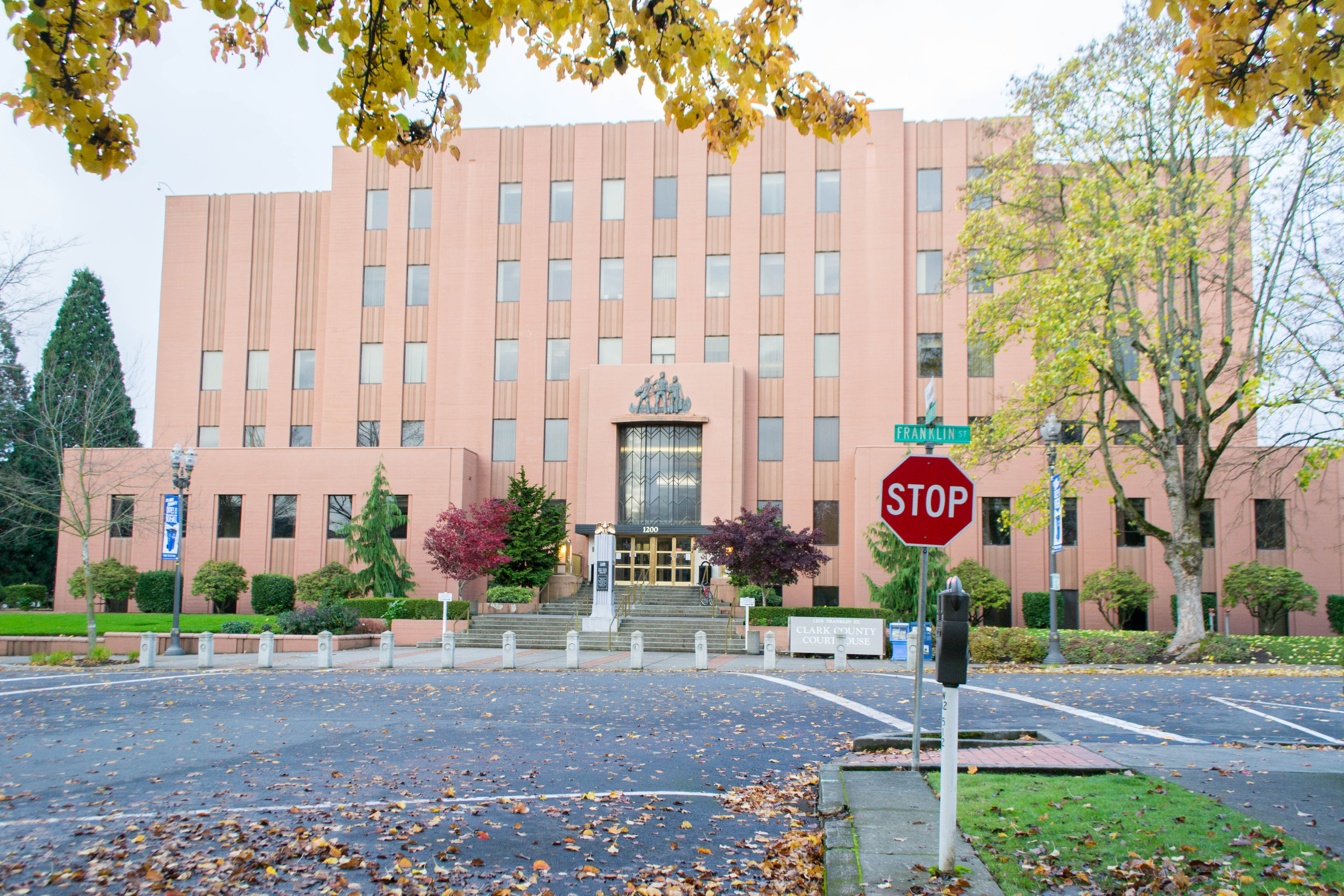
- Clark County Courthouse

- Seal

- Location within the U.S. state of Washington
- Coordinates: 45°46′N 122°29′W
- Country: United States
- State: Washington
- Founded: August 20, 1845 as Vancouver District
- Named for: William Clark on September 3, 1849
- Seat: Vancouver
- Largest city: Vancouver

Area
  - Total: 656 sq mi (1,700 km^{2})
  - Land: 629 sq mi (1,630 km^{2})
  - Water: 27 sq mi (70 km^{2}) 4.1%

Population (2020)
  - Total: 503,311
  - Estimate (2025): 532,119 ▲
  - Density: 800/sq mi (309/km^{2})
- Time zone: UTC−8 (Pacific)
  - Summer (DST): UTC−7 (PDT)
- Congressional district: 3rd
- Website: clark.wa.gov

Clark County is the southernmost county in the U.S. state of Washington. As of the 2020 census, the population was 503,311, making it Washington's fifth-most populous county. Its county seat and largest city is Vancouver. It was the first county in Washington, originally named Vancouver County in 1845 before being renamed for William Clark of the Lewis and Clark Expedition in 1849. It was created by the Provisional Government of Oregon in Oregon Country on August 20, 1845, and at that time covered the entire present-day state. Clark County is the third-most-populous county in the Portland metropolitan area, and is across the Columbia River from Portland, Oregon.

== History ==
Clark County was created on August 20, 1845, as Vancouver District, named for its town, following the removal of the area from three other districts on July 27, 1844. It included all the land north of the Columbia River, west of the Rocky Mountains, and south of Alaska. On December 21, 1845, the provisional government changed its name to Vancouver County. At that time it stretched from the Columbia River to 54 degrees 40 minutes North Latitude in what is now British Columbia, Canada. On June 15, 1846, the United States Senate approved the present boundary between the U.S. and Canada at the 49th parallel.

On August 13, 1848, President James K. Polk signed an act creating the entire region as the Oregon Territory. On September 3, 1849, the Oregon Territorial Legislature modified the borders again and changed its name to Clarke County in honor of explorer William Clark. At this time it included all of present-day Washington and continued to be divided and subdivided until reaching its present area in 1880. It was not until 1925 that the spelling was corrected to its present form.

In September 1902 the Yacolt Burn, the largest fire in state history, began in neighboring Skamania County and swept west along a 12-mile front to Yacolt, nearly engulfing the town. Salvaging the remaining timber was a lucrative industry until 1924.

== Geography ==
According to the United States Census Bureau, the county has a total area of 656 square miles (1,700 km^{2}), of which 629 square miles (1,630 km^{2}) is land and 27 square miles (70 km^{2}) (4.1%) is water. It is the fifth-smallest county in Washington by land area.

Clark County is surrounded on two sides by the Columbia River and on the north by the North Fork of the Lewis River. The East Fork of the Lewis River and the Washougal River cut across the county. The largest stream arising solely within the county is Salmon Creek, which terminates at Vancouver Lake before eventually flowing into the Columbia River.

Like most of Oregon and Washington south of Puget Sound into the Willamette Valley the landscape and climate of Clark County are determined by its placement between the volcanic Pacific Coast and Cascade Ranges, where glaciation helped form a U-shaped valley which meets the river valley of the Columbia River as it leaves the Columbia River Gorge. Volcanic andisol soils are common, with fertile mollisols in the lower areas. The central and southwest areas of the county are generally flat floodplains, sculpted by torrents of prehistoric Lake Missoula. A series of dramatic floods known as the Missoula Floods took place 15,000–13,000 years ago, as several ice dams melted, forming a series of low steps such as the "Heights", "Mill Plain", "Fourth Plain" and "Fifth Plain". Clark County's Köppen climate classification is "Csb".

Many lakes border the river in the lowlands near Ridgefield, including Vancouver Lake. The eastern and northern parts of Clark County contain forested foothills of the Cascade Mountains, rising to an elevation of 4,000 feet (1,200 m) along the border with Skamania County. Larch Mountain is the county’s highest freestanding peak.

Mount Hood, Mount St. Helens and Mount Adams are all visible from Clark County, and cold winter winds through the Columbia River Gorge often bring freezing rain and a coating of glaze ice or clear ice is sometimes known locally as a "silver thaw", especially in southeastern areas of the county closest to the gorge. The counterpart to this are warm winds from the southwest known locally as the "Pineapple Express".

=== Climate ===
Spring thaws can swell county waterways, and two of the most destructive floods were those of the Columbia River in June 1894 and May 1948. The 1948 Memorial Day flood nearly reached the Interstate Bridge’s support piers and completely destroyed nearby Vanport, Oregon. Construction of The Dalles Dam and the destruction of Celilo Falls are credited with reducing the severity of such floods.

Significant windstorms in Clark County include the Columbus Day windstorm of October 12, 1962, and an April 6, 1972, tornado which rated F3 on the Fujita scale, striking a local school. A "Friday the 13th" storm in November 1981 brought winds up to 70 miles per hour (110 km/h), with other storms including the inauguration day storm of January 20, 1993, the Guadalupe Day storm of December 12, 1995 (with winds up to 95 miles per hour (153 km/h) at Washougal, Washington) and small tornado on January 10, 2008, which destroyed a boathouse at Vancouver Lake and caused damage to buildings in Hazel Dell before dissolving near Hockinson.

=== Ecology ===
Flora and fauna of the region include the normal ecological succession from lowland big leaf maple and western red cedar through Garry oak on up through fire-dependent species such as lodgepole pine and Douglas fir, as well as grand fir, silver fir and other species common to Gifford Pinchot National Forest. In addition to a wide variety of birds including great blue heron, raptors such as barred owl, osprey, red-tailed hawk and bald eagle, corvids (raven, crow, California scrub and Steller's jay) and others, the native streams are home to various species of salmon and the Vancouver Trout Hatchery. Larger mammals include black-tailed deer, coyote, raccoon, skunk and invasive opossum; with sightings of lynx, bobcat, black bear, cougar and elk not uncommon, especially in the northern parts of the county. Common foods used by the indigenous people such as the Klickitat tribe and Chinook included salmon, huckleberry and Camassia quamash (after which the city of Camas, Washington is named).

=== Geographic features ===
- Cascade Mountains
- Columbia River
- Vancouver Lake
- East Fork Lewis River
- Lacamas Creek
- Lacamas Lake
- Battle Ground Lake
- Moulton Falls Archived August 31, 2019, at the Wayback Machine
- Lucia Falls Archived August 31, 2019, at the Wayback Machine
- Larch Mountain
- Silver Star Mountain
- Green Mountain
- Lewisville Park
- Daybreak Park
- Vancouver Lake Park
- Klineline Park

=== Major highways ===
- Interstate 5
- Interstate 205
- State Route 14
- State Route 500
- State Route 501
- State Route 502
- State Route 503

==== Former major highway ====
- U.S. Route 99
- U.S. Route 830
- State Route 120
- State Route 140

=== Adjacent counties ===
- Cowlitz County - north
- Skamania County - east
- Multnomah County, Oregon - south
- Columbia County, Oregon - southwest

=== National protected areas ===
- Fort Vancouver National Historic Site (part)
- Gifford Pinchot National Forest (part)
- Ridgefield National Wildlife Refuge
- Steigerwald Lake National Wildlife Refuge

== Economy ==
Clark County's largest industries include health care, professional and business services, and retail. In 2019, approximately 65,000 Clark County residents commuted to work in Portland, Oregon; approximately 17,000 residents from Oregon commuted to work in Clark County. Although Washington does not have a state income tax, residents who worked in Oregon were required to pay income tax to that state for earnings in Oregon. Clark County residents also cross the Columbia River to shop without sales taxes, which Oregon also lacks; this phenomenon caused up to $5.9 million in estimated lost sales tax revenue for the county government in 2022. Data collected by the Oregon Office of Economic Analysis indicated that nearly 14,000 residents moved to Clark County from Portland in 2022.

== Demographics ==
Historical population
Census	Pop.	Note	%±
1850	643		—
1860	2,384		270.8%
1870	3,081		29.2%
1880	5,490		78.2%
1890	11,709		113.3%
1900	13,419		14.6%
1910	26,115		94.6%
1920	32,805		25.6%
1930	40,316		22.9%
1940	49,852		23.7%
1950	85,307		71.1%
1960	93,809		10.0%
1970	128,454		36.9%
1980	192,227		49.6%
1990	238,053		23.8%
2000	345,238		45.0%
2010	425,363		23.2%
2020	503,311		18.3%
2025 (est.)	532,119	▲	5.7%
U.S. Decennial Census; 1790–1960 1900–1990; 1990–2000 2010–2020

=== Racial and ethnic composition ===
Clark County, Washington – Racial and ethnic composition Note: the US Census treats Hispanic/Latino as an ethnic category. This table excludes Latinos from the racial categories and assigns them to a separate category. Hispanics/Latinos may be of any race.
Race / Ethnicity (NH = Non-Hispanic)	Pop 1980	Pop 1990	Pop 2000	Pop 2010	Pop 2020	% 1980	% 1990	% 2000	% 2010	% 2020
White alone (NH)	182,923	221,552	299,134	347,793	366,727	95.16%	93.07%	86.65%	81.76%	72.86%
Black or African American alone (NH)	1,670	2,873	5,628	8,025	10,850	0.87%	1.21%	1.63%	1.89%	2.16%
Native American or Alaska Native alone (NH)	1,521	2,129	2,575	2,970	3,051	0.79%	0.89%	0.75%	0.70%	0.61%
Asian alone (NH)	2,294	5,478	10,993	17,276	23,910	1.19%	2.30%	3.18%	4.06%	4.75%
Native Hawaiian or Pacific Islander alone (NH)	x	x	1,225	2,589	5,127	x	x	0.35%	0.61%	1.02%
Other race alone (NH)	760	149	475	639	2,536	0.40%	0.06%	0.14%	0.15%	0.50%
Mixed race or Multiracial (NH)	x	x	8,960	13,905	32,320	x	x	2.60%	3.27%	6.42%
Hispanic or Latino (any race)	3,059	5,872	16,248	32,166	58,790	1.59%	2.47%	4.71%	7.56%	11.68%
Total	192,227	238,053	345,238	425,363	503,311	100.00%	100.00%	100.00%	100.00%	100.00%

=== 2020 census ===
As of the 2020 census, there were 503,311 people, 187,188 households, and 195,036 housing units in the county.

The population density was 800.8 people per square mile (309.2 people/km^{2}).

The racial makeup (including Hispanics in the racial counts) of the county was 75.5% White, 2.3% Black or African American, 1.0% American Indian and Alaska Native, 4.8% Asian, 5.0% from some other race, and 10.4% from two or more races. Hispanic or Latino residents of any race comprised 11.7% of the population.

Of the residents, 23.3% were under the age of 18, 5.6% were under 5, and 16.4% were 65 years of age or older; the median age was 38.8 years. For every 100 females there were 97.6 males, and for every 100 females age 18 and over there were 95.6 males. 86.5% of residents lived in urban areas and 13.5% lived in rural areas.

The average household size was 2.67 people per household. Of the 187,188 households, 32.4% had children under the age of 18 living with them and 23.5% had a female householder with no spouse or partner present. About 23.1% of all households were made up of individuals and 10.0% had someone living alone who was 65 years of age or older.

There were 195,036 housing units, of which 4.0% were vacant. Among occupied housing units, 64.8% were owner-occupied and 35.2% were renter-occupied. The homeowner vacancy rate was 0.9% and the rental vacancy rate was 5.1%. Reports indicate that approximately 8,200 individuals experiences homelessness in the county in 2025.

=== 2010 census ===
As of the 2010 census, there were 425,363 people, 158,099 households, and 110,672 families residing in the county. The population density was 676.2 people per square mile (261.1 people/km^{2}). There were 167,413 housing units at an average density of 266.2 units per square mile (102.8 units/km^{2}). The racial makeup of the county was 85.4% white, 4.1% Asian, 2.0% black or African American, 0.9% American Indian, 0.6% Pacific islander, 2.9% from other races, and 4.0% from two or more races. Those of Hispanic or Latino origin made up 7.6% of the population. In terms of ancestry, 24.4% were German, 13.1% were Irish, 13.1% were English, 5.7% were Norwegian, and 4.3% were American.

Of the 158,099 households, 36.3% had children under the age of 18 living with them, 53.6% were married couples living together, 11.3% had a female householder with no husband present, 30.0% were non-families, and 23.1% of all households were made up of individuals. The average household size was 2.67 and the average family size was 3.15. The median age was 36.7 years.

The median income for a household in the county was $58,262 and the median income for a family was $67,352. Males had a median income of $52,160 versus $38,167 for females. The per capita income for the county was $27,828. About 7.8% of families and 10.9% of the population were below the poverty line, including 14.9% of those under age 18 and 7.2% of those age 65 or over.

=== 2000 census ===
As of the 2000 census, there were 345,238 people, 127,208 households, and 90,953 families residing in the county. The population density was 550 people per square mile (210 people/km^{2}). There were 134,030 housing units at an average density of 213 units per square mile (82 units/km^{2}). The racial makeup of the county was 88.82% White, 1.68% Black or African American, 0.84% Native American, 3.21% Asian, 0.37% Pacific Islander, 1.99% from other races, and 3.08% from two or more races. 4.71% of the population were Hispanic or Latino of any race. 17.7% were of German, 10.2% English, 8.6% Irish, 8.6% United States and 5.1% Norwegian ancestry. 88.8% spoke only English at home; 3.6% spoke Spanish and 1.9% Russian.

There were 127,208 households, out of which 37.20% had children under the age of 18 living with them, 56.80% were married couples living together, 10.30% had a female householder with no husband present, and 28.50% were non-families. 21.80% of all households were made up of individuals, and 6.80% had someone living alone who was 65 years of age or older. The average household size was 2.69 and the average family size was 3.15.

In the county, 28.70% were under the age of 18, 8.40% from 18 to 24, 30.80% from 25 to 44, 22.60% from 45 to 64, and 9.50% were 65 years of age or older. The median age was 34 years. For every 100 females, there were 98.50 males. For every 100 females age 18 and over, there were 95.90 males.

The median income for a household in the county was $48,376, and the median income for a family was $54,016. Males had a median income of $41,337 versus $28,537 for females. The per capita income for the county was $21,448. About 6.90% of families and 9.10% of the population were below the poverty line, including 11.70% of those under age 18 and 6.80% of those age 65 or over.

=== Religion ===
Clark County is religiously diverse, with no single group comprising 10% of the population. The four groups that exceed 1% are nondenominational Christian with 30,026 members, the Catholic Church with 26,886 members, The Church of Jesus Christ of Latter-day Saints with 20,793 members, and the Evangelical Lutheran Church of America with 4,827. The area is also home to the nation's largest population of the Old Apostolic Lutheran Church with between 8,000 and 12,000 members living in the county. This is estimated because the Church doesn't keep membership rolls.

== Emergency services ==
The Clark County Sheriff's Office is the local, county-level law enforcement agency serving Clark County, Washington. The sheriff's office was established in 1849 and is the oldest law enforcement organization in the state of Washington. Sheriff John Horch and Undersheriff James Hansen lead the Clark County Sheriff's Office.

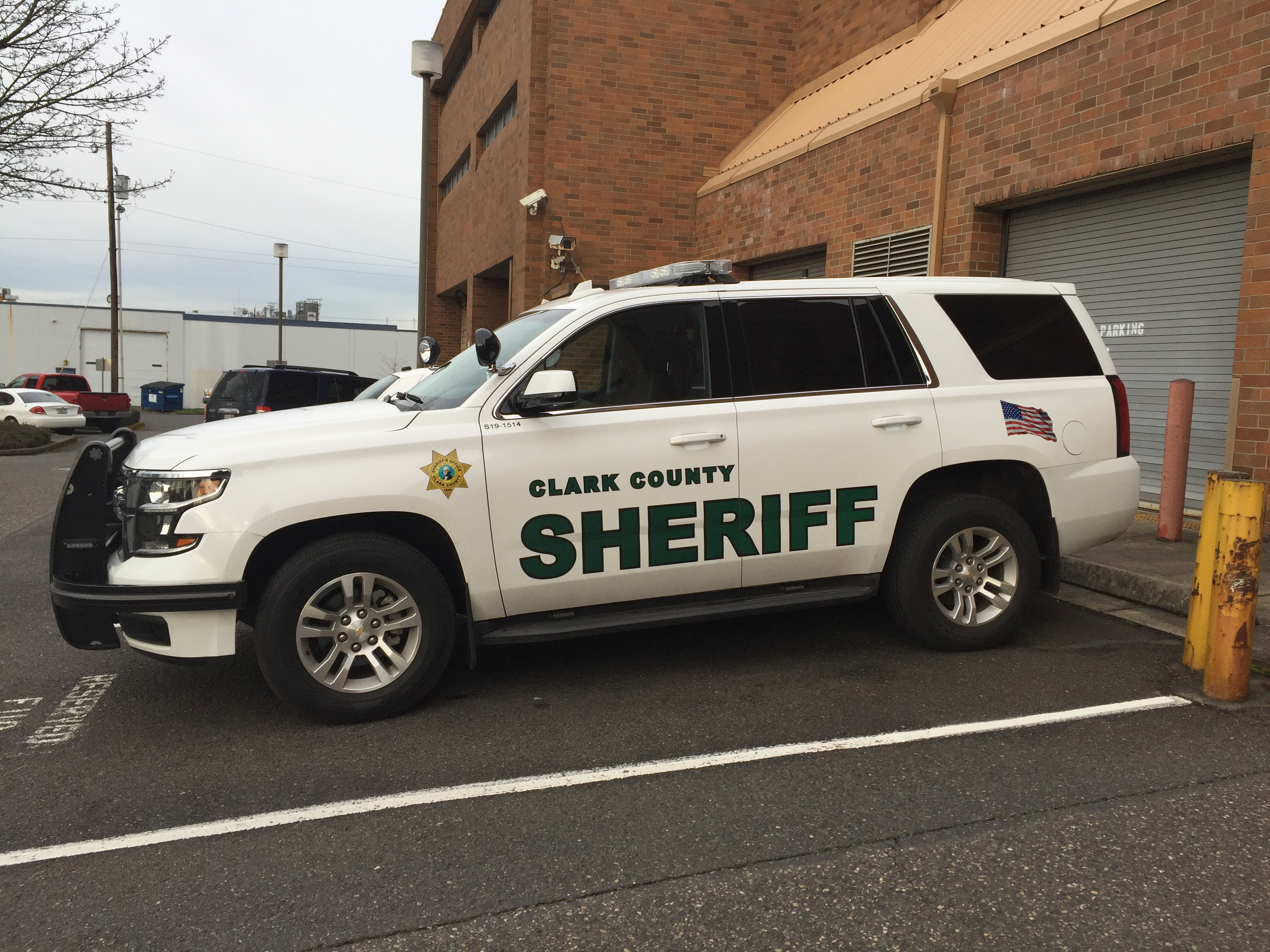
A patrol car of the Clark County Sheriff's Office

On March 16, 2014, Clark County Fire & Rescue commissioned the Mary Firstenburg, a new fireboat purchased with the financial support from a bequest from Firstenburg's family, and from a FEMA Port Security Grant.

== Government and politics ==
Since 2014, Clark County has had a home rule charter with a council–manager government. The Clark County Council was created in 2014 and has five seats elected by districts of proportional size that are redrawn every 10 years. Prior to the adoption of the home rule charter, the county had a three-member commission. The county manager is the chief executive officer appointed by the council and oversees the administrative departments of the government. Kathleen Otto has been the county manager of Clark County since her appointment to the role in 2021.

As of 2025, the current elected officials are:

- Assessor - Peter Van Nortwick (R)
- Auditor - Greg Kimsey (R)
- Clerk - Scott Weber (R)
- Councilors
  - District 1 Glen Yung (NP)
  - District 2 Michelle Belkot (NP)
  - District 3 Wil Fuentes (NP)
  - District 4 Matt Little (NP)
  - District 5 Sue Marshall - County Chair (NP)
- Prosecuting Attorney - Tony Golik (D)
- Sheriff - John Horch (NP)
- Treasurer - Alishia Topper (NP)

In presidential elections, Clark County leans Democratic having voted for the party in every presidential election since 2008. This is in contrast to the rest of Southwest Washington, which leans Republican. In 2024, the county swung leftward by 2%, despite Washington and the country swinging rightward. In Congress, the county lies in Washington's 3rd congressional district.

Before 2008, Clark County was a swing county having voted for the winner in every single election between 1900 and 2004 with the exception of 1916, 1956, 1968, and 1988.

United States presidential election results for Clark County, Washington
Year	Republican		Democratic		Third party(ies)	
Year	No.	%	No.	%	No.	%
1892	1,089	41.95%	966	37.21%	541	20.84%
1896	1,497	48.23%	1,547	49.84%	60	1.93%
1900	1,668	57.88%	1,025	35.57%	189	6.56%
1904	2,436	71.88%	515	15.20%	438	12.92%
1908	2,416	58.83%	1,250	30.44%	441	10.74%
1912	1,872	23.37%	2,549	31.82%	3,589	44.81%
1916	4,419	48.93%	3,728	41.28%	885	9.80%
1920	4,852	52.20%	2,941	31.64%	1,502	16.16%
1924	5,215	47.61%	2,004	18.29%	3,735	34.10%
1928	7,786	62.58%	4,467	35.90%	189	1.52%
1932	4,901	32.33%	9,104	60.05%	1,155	7.62%
1936	4,868	26.24%	12,714	68.52%	972	5.24%
1940	8,776	40.03%	12,931	58.98%	218	0.99%
1944	12,312	39.03%	18,861	59.78%	376	1.19%
1948	11,546	38.32%	17,154	56.93%	1,432	4.75%
1952	18,973	50.83%	18,153	48.63%	202	0.54%
1956	19,330	49.51%	19,665	50.36%	51	0.13%
1960	20,080	49.13%	20,771	50.82%	17	0.04%
1964	12,300	29.43%	29,341	70.21%	149	0.36%
1968	18,858	42.40%	23,046	51.82%	2,570	5.78%
1972	28,775	49.13%	27,179	46.41%	2,615	4.46%
1976	27,938	45.65%	31,080	50.78%	2,183	3.57%
1980	33,223	46.10%	30,584	42.43%	8,268	11.47%
1984	40,681	52.86%	35,248	45.80%	1,028	1.34%
1988	37,285	47.61%	40,021	51.11%	1,000	1.28%
1992	36,906	34.64%	42,648	40.03%	26,982	25.33%
1996	46,794	41.51%	52,254	46.35%	13,682	12.14%
2000	67,219	49.59%	61,767	45.57%	6,558	4.84%
2004	88,646	52.01%	79,538	46.67%	2,255	1.32%
2008	84,212	46.08%	95,356	52.17%	3,196	1.75%
2012	92,951	48.72%	93,382	48.94%	4,472	2.34%
2016	92,441	44.34%	92,757	44.49%	23,287	11.17%
2020	126,303	45.86%	140,324	50.95%	8,776	3.19%
2024	123,998	44.83%	143,206	51.78%	9,374	3.39%

== Communities ==
=== Cities ===
- Battle Ground
- Camas
- La Center
- Ridgefield
- Vancouver (county seat)
- Washougal
- Woodland (mostly in Cowlitz County)

=== Town ===
- Yacolt

=== Census-designated places ===
- Amboy
- Barberton
- Brush Prairie
- Cherry Grove
- Dollars Corner
- Duluth
- Felida
- Fern Prairie
- Five Corners
- Hazel Dell
- Hockinson
- Lake Shore
- Lewisville
- Meadow Glade
- Minnehaha
- Mount Vista
- Orchards
- Salmon Creek
- Venersborg
- Walnut Grove

=== Unincorporated communities ===
- Chelatchie
- Etna
- Fargher Lake
- Hall
- Heisson
- Mill Plain
- Proebstel

== Education ==
School districts include:

- Battle Ground Public Schools
- Camas School District
- Evergreen Public Schools (Clark)
- Green Mountain School District
- Hockinson School District
- La Center School District
- Mount Pleasant School District (Washington)
- Ridgefield School District
- Vancouver Public Schools
- Washougal School District
- Woodland Public Schools

State-operated schools:

- Washington State School for the Blind
- Washington School for the Deaf

== See also ==
- National Register of Historic Places listings in Clark County, Washington
- Washington State University Vancouver
