= Battle Ground High School =

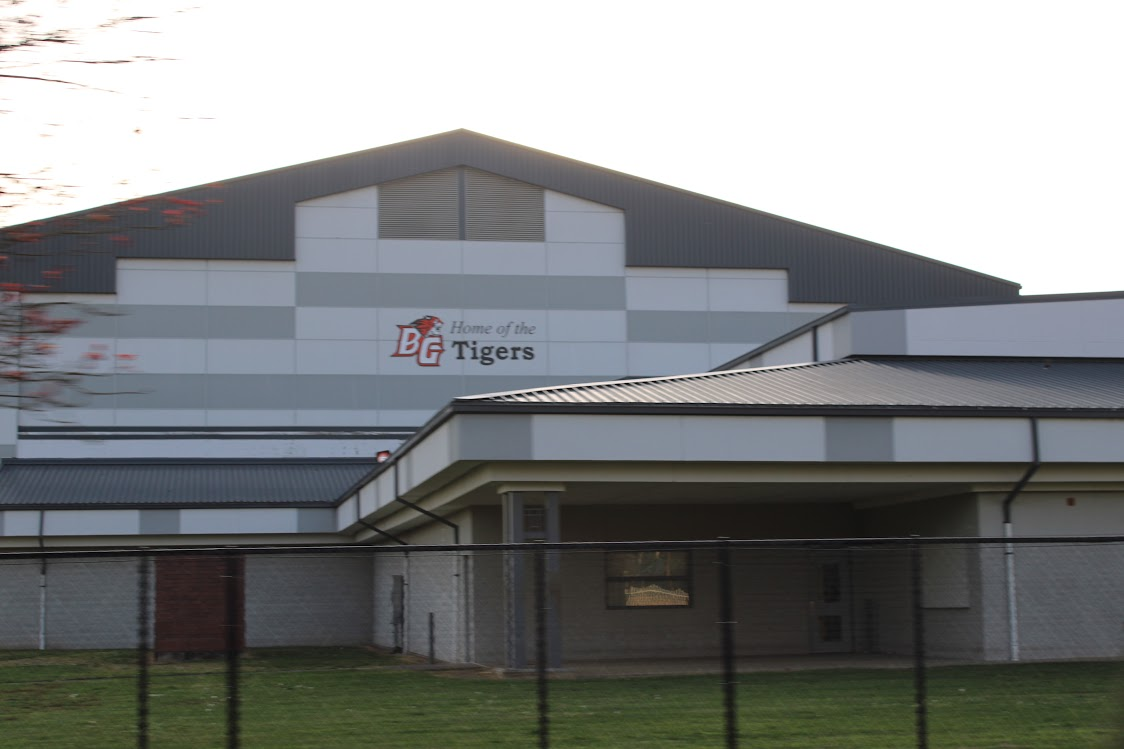

Location
- 300 West Main Street; Battle Ground, Washington 98604; United States
- Coordinates: 45°46′58″N 122°32′27″W

Information
- Other name: BGHS
- Type: Public high school
- Motto: Unity, Toughness, Class
- School district: Battle Ground Public Schools
- NCES School ID: 530038000049
- Principal: Heather Ichimura
- Teaching staff: 92.65 (on an FTE basis)
- Grades: 9–12
- Enrollment: 1,752 (2023-2024)
- Student to teacher ratio: 18.91
- Colors: Orange and black
- Athletics conference: WIAA District 4 Greater St. Helens 4A
- Mascot: Tiger
- Nickname: Tigers
- Publication: The Tiger Times
- Website: bghs.battlegroundps.org

Battle Ground High School (BGHS) is a public high school in Battle Ground, Washington, United States. It is part of the Battle Ground Public Schools district.

== Sports ==
Battle Ground is a member of the Washington Interscholastic Athletics Association (WIAA) and competes in the Greater St. Helens 4A league.

=== Wrestling ===
In 2006, the Battle Ground Tigers won the WIAA State Wrestling Team Championship. The Tigers finished with 110 total points, 7.5 points ahead of second place Auburn High School. The Tigers' effort was led by junior Trevor Hall (145 lbs.), sophomore Eric Starks (135 lbs) and senior Anthony Hayes (119 lbs), who all won individual state championships. Junior Andrew Buck (171 lbs) added a second-place finish as well.

=== Football ===
League championships

- 1964, Battle Ground won the 1964 Southwest Washington AA League Championship with a 5-0-1 league record and an overall record of 6-1-1. The Tigers defeated Evergreen (27-25), Centralia (20-6), Columbia River (27-6), W.F. West (13-12), and Camas (20-6) while playing Mark Morris to a tie (7-7) in league play.

Teams that started 5-0

- 1970 - Kelso (12-6), at R.A. Long (8-7), Mark Morris (28-16), at Fort Vancouver (14-6), Camas (7-6). Finished season 5-3 (head coach Newt Kier)
- 1990 - Fort Vancouver (40-2), at Mountain View (31-7), Columbia River (49-15), at Mark Morris (34-6), Camas (35-14). Finished season 7-1 (head coach Eric Bernstein)
- 1991 - at Kelso (13-0), Columbia River (30-20), at Fort Vancouver (21-0), at Mountain View (23-21), Mark Morris (27-7). Finished season 8-2 (head coach Butch Blue)
- 2012 - at R.A. Long (41-27), at Prairie (41-21), Decatur (56-20), at Auburn Mountainview (33-14), at Evergreen (40-6). (head coach Larry Peck)

=== State championships ===
- Bowling: 2012, 2013, 2014 and 2015
- Boys' basketball: 1990
- Boys' Tennis: 1993
- Boys' Wrestling: 2006
- Girls' Basketball: 1991
- Girls' Golf: 1991

=== State runners-up ===
- Boys' Basketball: 1971, 1991
- Boys' Gymnastics: 1977, 1979
- Boys' Track: 1990
- Girls' Basketball: 1979, 1992, 1994
- Girls' Track: 1994

== Arts ==
=== Jazz Band ===
Battle Ground High School usually has enough students involved in jazz band to create three before-school jazz bands; Intermediate Jazz 2, Intermediate Jazz 1, and Advanced Jazz Bands. All three bands compete; the Intermediate Jazz 2 competes at the 2A level, the Intermediate Jazz 1 competes at the 3A level, and the Advanced Jazz Band competes at the 4A level. The Battle Ground Advanced Jazz Band has won sweepstakes multiple times at the Clackamas Community College Jazz Festival, first place at the Lionel Hampton Jazz Festival in Idaho, and first place at the Portland Rose Festival Jazz Band Classic. In 2002 the band recorded a CD entitled How Sweet It Is, featuring nine jazz classics. They have also taken 2nd place at the Essentially Ellington festival in New York, New York in 2006, and 3rd place at Swing Central in Savannah, Georgia in 2009. In 2023, the Advanced Jazz Band took first place in the Basically Basie Competition, part of the Kansas City Jazz Summit, held on the campus of Kansas City Kansas Community College.

=== Marching Band ===
The Battle Ground High School Marching Band placed first in the Out of State Division A (99 members or less) on June 11, 2011, in the Grand Floral Parade in Portland, Oregon, part of the Portland Rose Festival, beating the previous year's winner, Columbia River High School, and their rival, Prairie High School. The Tiger Marching Band also placed second in the same parade the previous year.

== Notable alumni ==
- Donald Firesmith, software engineer and novelist
- Richie Frahm, shooting guard in the National Basketball Association
- Zia McCabe, musician in the band The Dandy Warhols
- Kaleb McGary, NFL player
- Gerry Staley, three-time All-Star Major League Baseball pitcher
