= Battle Ground, Washington =

- City
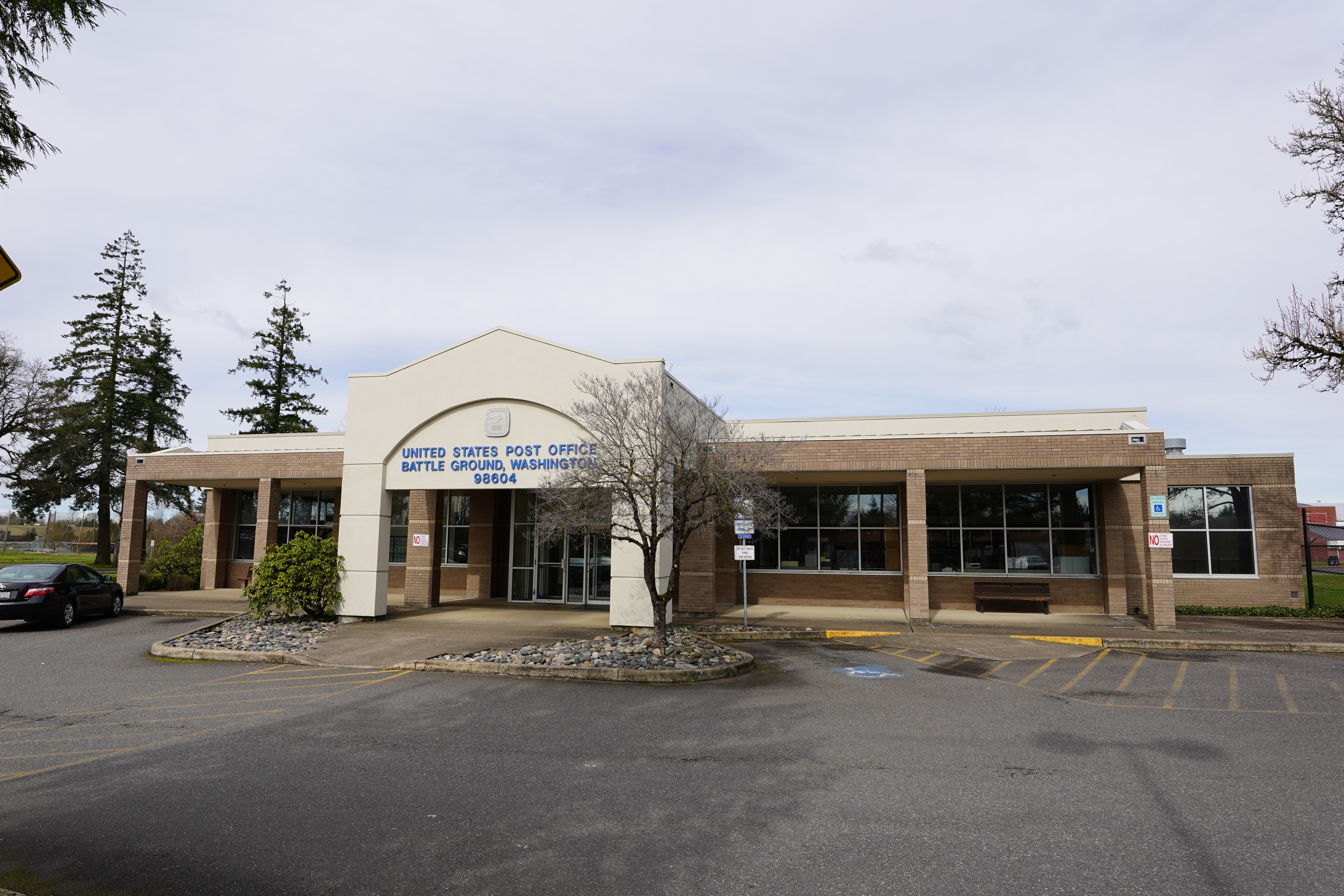
- Battle Ground Post Office
- Interactive map of Battle Ground, Washington
- Coordinates: 45°45′46″N 122°31′50″W
- Country: United States
- State: Washington
- County: Clark
- Settled: 1886
- Platted: 1902
- Incorporated: June 18, 1951

Government
  - Type: Council–manager
  - Mayor: Eric Overholser
  - City manager: Vacant

Area
  - Total: 8.68 sq mi (22.49 km^{2})
  - Land: 8.68 sq mi (22.49 km^{2})
  - Water: 0 sq mi (0.00 km^{2})
- Elevation: 285 ft (87 m)

Population (2020)
  - Total: 20,743
  - Estimate (2025): 23,513
  - Density: 2,570/sq mi (991/km^{2})
- Time zone: UTC−8 (Pacific (PST))
  - Summer (DST): UTC−7 (PDT)
- ZIP Code: 98604
- Area codes: 360, 564
- FIPS code: 53-04475
- GNIS feature ID: 2409796
- Website: cityofbg.org

Battle Ground is a city in Clark County, Washington, United States. The population was 20,743 at the 2020 census. As of 2025, its population is estimated at 23,513.

== History ==
=== Name ===
Battle Ground got its name from a standoff between a group of the Klickitat peoples and a military force from the Vancouver Barracks, which had recently transitioned to a U.S. Army post. By 1855, members of the Klickitat peoples had been imprisoned at the Vancouver Barracks. The hostile conditions of their detainment inspired some of the Klickitats to decamp.

This group of Klickitat peoples headed north, led by Chief Umtuch (or Umtux, according to some accounts). When the community at Fort Vancouver discovered this escape, they assembled an armed contingent led by Captain William Strong to pursue the Klickitats. Captain Strong's party eventually found the Klickitats near the present-day location of downtown Battle Ground.

Details of the standoff vary. However, accounts agree that Chief Umtuch and Captain Strong engaged in some sort of negotiations, which resulted in the Klickitats agreeing to return to the Barracks. After this decision, at least one shot was fired, resulting in the death of Chief Umtuch, reportedly by one of Captain Strong's soldiers.

The Klickitat asked Captain Strong to leave them alone so they might properly bury their chief. After some deliberation, Captain Strong agreed, provided the Klickitats promised to return to the Fort, which they did a couple of days later.

As a result of this event, settlers at the fort began to refer to that site as 'Strong's Battle Ground', which was later shortened to 'Battle Ground.' Two schools in Battle Ground were later named after Captain Strong and Chief Umtuch.

=== Early settlement ===
Battle Ground was first settled in 1886 by Augustus H. Richter, who platted the town in 1902. Battle Ground was officially incorporated on June 18, 1951. During early settlement in the area, large numbers of people populated Fort Vancouver and locations closer to the Columbia River.

=== Later development ===
The population of Battle Ground doubled between 2000 and 2010, becoming the second-largest city in Clark County. The city opened a community center in 2008 and a new public library in 2009. In 2026, the city announced a grant program allocating $50,000 to aid businesses with updating their facades in its Old Town district.

In January 2026, Battle Ground City Council elected Eric Overholser to the position of mayor in a 4-3 vote. As mayor, Overholser was quickly involved in several contentious incidents around his public statements and intentions around municipal governance; including vocal opposition to LGBTQIA+ rights, support of United States Immigration and Customs Enforcement, and support for "traditional" family structures in the city.

In July 2026, Camden Spiller and his brother Max Spiller purchased The Reflector, the local independent newspaper.

== Geography ==
Battle Ground is located about 11 miles (18 km) north northeast of Vancouver, 32 miles (51 km) south southwest of Mount St. Helens. It is near the geographical center of Clark County. Battle Ground is 25.5 miles (41.0 km) from Portland, Oregon, and 161 miles (259 km) from Seattle.

According to the United States Census Bureau, the city has a total area of 8.68 square miles (22.48 km^{2}), all land.

=== Climate ===
Climate data for Battle Ground, Washington, 1991–2020 normals, extremes 1929–present
Month	Jan	Feb	Mar	Apr	May	Jun	Jul	Aug	Sep	Oct	Nov	Dec	Year
Record high °F (°C)	68 (20)	74 (23)	80 (27)	91 (33)	101 (38)	112 (44)	107 (42)	105 (41)	105 (41)	93 (34)	72 (22)	65 (18)	112 (44)
Mean maximum °F (°C)	57.4 (14.1)	61.8 (16.6)	70.0 (21.1)	77.8 (25.4)	85.3 (29.6)	89.2 (31.8)	94.7 (34.8)	95.4 (35.2)	90.8 (32.7)	78.1 (25.6)	63.6 (17.6)	56.8 (13.8)	98.1 (36.7)
Mean daily maximum °F (°C)	46.1 (7.8)	50.4 (10.2)	54.7 (12.6)	59.7 (15.4)	66.5 (19.2)	71.1 (21.7)	78.6 (25.9)	79.6 (26.4)	74.5 (23.6)	62.5 (16.9)	51.6 (10.9)	45.1 (7.3)	61.7 (16.5)
Daily mean °F (°C)	39.0 (3.9)	41.1 (5.1)	44.7 (7.1)	48.8 (9.3)	54.9 (12.7)	59.2 (15.1)	64.6 (18.1)	64.9 (18.3)	60.0 (15.6)	51.2 (10.7)	43.5 (6.4)	38.5 (3.6)	50.9 (10.5)
Mean daily minimum °F (°C)	31.9 (−0.1)	31.7 (−0.2)	34.6 (1.4)	37.9 (3.3)	43.3 (6.3)	47.3 (8.5)	50.6 (10.3)	50.2 (10.1)	45.6 (7.6)	39.9 (4.4)	35.4 (1.9)	31.9 (−0.1)	40.0 (4.4)
Mean minimum °F (°C)	20.5 (−6.4)	21.8 (−5.7)	25.8 (−3.4)	29.4 (−1.4)	34.0 (1.1)	40.0 (4.4)	43.7 (6.5)	42.7 (5.9)	37.3 (2.9)	29.1 (−1.6)	23.9 (−4.5)	19.7 (−6.8)	15.4 (−9.2)
Record low °F (°C)	−11 (−24)	−9 (−23)	16 (−9)	21 (−6)	26 (−3)	32 (0)	34 (1)	35 (2)	26 (−3)	19 (−7)	4 (−16)	−1 (−18)	−11 (−24)
Average precipitation inches (mm)	7.20 (183)	5.32 (135)	5.59 (142)	4.54 (115)	3.36 (85)	2.31 (59)	0.63 (16)	0.80 (20)	2.20 (56)	4.82 (122)	7.61 (193)	7.99 (203)	52.37 (1,330)
Average snowfall inches (cm)	0.5 (1.3)	0.3 (0.76)	0.2 (0.51)	0.0 (0.0)	0.0 (0.0)	0.0 (0.0)	0.0 (0.0)	0.0 (0.0)	0.0 (0.0)	0.0 (0.0)	0.0 (0.0)	0.4 (1.0)	1.4 (3.6)
Average precipitation days (≥ 0.01 in)	21.4	17.8	20.7	18.4	13.6	10.7	4.2	4.3	8.5	16.0	21.2	21.7	178.5
Average snowy days (≥ 0.1 in)	0.4	0.3	0.2	0.0	0.0	0.0	0.0	0.0	0.0	0.0	0.0	0.7	1.6
Source: NOAA

== Demographics ==
Historical population
Census	Pop.	Note	%±
1960	888		—
1970	1,438		61.9%
1980	2,774		92.9%
1990	3,758		35.5%
2000	9,296		147.4%
2010	17,571		89.0%
2020	20,743		18.1%
2025 (est.)	23,513		13.4%
U.S. Decennial Census; 2020 Census

Between 2000 and 2005, Battle Ground ranked fourth in the state for population growth, out of 279 eligible incorporated communities.

=== 2020 census ===
Racial composition as of the 2020 census
Race	Number	Percent
White	17,409	83.9%
Black or African American	194	0.9%
American Indian and Alaska Native	128	0.6%
Asian	408	2.0%
Native Hawaiian and Other Pacific Islander	73	0.4%
Some other race	587	2.8%
Two or more races	1,944	9.4%
Hispanic or Latino (of any race)	1,825	8.8%

As of the 2020 census, Battle Ground had a population of 20,743, 7,178 households, and 5,275 families; the median age was 34.6 years, 27.1% of residents were under the age of 18, and 13.3% of residents were 65 years of age or older. For every 100 females there were 95.3 males, and for every 100 females age 18 and over there were 91.0 males age 18 or over.

The population density was 2,428.1 inhabitants per square mile (937.5/km^{2}).

98.1% of residents lived in urban areas, while 1.9% lived in rural areas.

There were 7,178 households in Battle Ground, of which 39.6% had children under the age of 18 living in them. Of all households, 55.8% were married-couple households, 12.7% were households with a male householder and no spouse or partner present, and 24.6% were households with a female householder and no spouse or partner present. About 20.2% of all households were made up of individuals and 10.0% had someone living alone who was 65 years of age or older.

There were 7,449 housing units, of which 3.6% were vacant. The homeowner vacancy rate was 1.5% and the rental vacancy rate was 5.3%.

The median household income was $94,360, and the per capita income was $37,287. 6.4% of the population were under the poverty line.

=== 2010 census ===
As of the 2010 census, there were 17,571 people, 5,652 households, and 4,365 families residing in the city. The population density was 2,454.1 inhabitants per square mile (947.5/km^{2}). There were 5,952 housing units at an average density of 831.3 per square mile (321.0/km^{2}). The racial makeup of the city was 90.5% White, 0.8% African American, 0.8% Native American, 1.9% Asian, 0.3% Pacific Islander, 2.1% from other races, and 3.5% from two or more races. Hispanic or Latino of any race were 6.5% of the population. 15.0% were of German, 10.7% Irish, 9.9% English and 6.4% Ukrainian ancestry.

There were 5,652 households, of which 50.2% had children under the age of 18 living with them, 59.7% were married couples living together, 12.9% had a female householder with no husband present, 4.6% had a male householder with no wife present, and 22.8% were non-families. 17.9% of all households were made up of individuals, and 7.1% had someone living alone who was 65 years of age or older. The average household size was 3.09 and the average family size was 3.53.

The median age in the city was 30 years. 34.5% of residents were under the age of 18; 9% were between the ages of 18 and 24; 29.4% were from 25 to 44; 19.2% were from 45 to 64, and 7.9% were 65 years of age or older. The gender makeup of the city was 49.0% male and 51.0% female.

=== 2000 census ===
As of the 2000 census, there were 9,296 people, 3,071 households, and 2,346 families residing in the city. The population density was 2,552.6 inhabitants per square mile (985.6/km^{2}). There were 3,196 housing units at an average density of 877.6 per square mile (338.8/km^{2}). The racial makeup of the city was 93.81% White, 0.49% African American, 0.86% Native American, 0.72% Asian, 0.11% Pacific Islander, 1.72% from other races, and 2.28% from two or more races. Hispanic or Latino of any race were 4.14% of the population. 15.4% were of German, 11.5% United States or American, 9.4% English, 7.2% Irish, 6.1% Finnish, and 5.8% Norwegian ancestry. 94.0% spoke English, 3.9% Spanish and 1.6% Russian as their first language.

There were 3,071 households, out of which 50.4% had children under the age of 18 living with them, 58.9% were married couples living together, 12.0% had a female householder with no husband present, and 23.6% were non-families. 18.2% of all households were made up of individuals, and 7.7% had someone living alone who was 65 years of age or older. The average household size was 2.99 and the average family size was 3.43.

In the city, the age distribution of the population shows 36.2% under the age of 18, 10.0% from 18 to 24, 32.9% from 25 to 44, 13.5% from 45 to 64, and 7.3% who were 65 years of age or older. The median age was 27 years. For every 100 females, there were 95.8 males. For every 100 females age 18 and over, there were 90.5 males.

The median income for a household in the city was $45,070, and the median income for a family was $49,876. Males had a median income of $41,133 versus $25,215 for females. The per capita income for the city was $17,139. About 7.3% of families and 9.3% of the population were below the poverty line, including 11.1% of those under age 18 and 8.4% of those age 65 or over.

=== Religion ===
Battle Ground is known for having one of the largest populations of Old Apostolic Lutheran Christians in the United States.

== Arts and culture ==
Every summer, Battle Ground hosts Harvest Days, comprising a number of community events such as parades and a chili cook-off.

Battle Ground participates annually in the Portland Rose Festival's Grand Floral Parade, and 2019 marked the city's 65th float in the parade. In 2006, it received the Sweepstakes Award for Most Outstanding Float in the Parade.

== Parks and recreation ==
Battle Ground contains 22 parks with a total of 72.8 acres (29.5 ha) of park space and an additional 206 acres (83 ha) of open space reserves in five areas. Of these parks, seven are classified as "undeveloped".

Undeveloped areas include Durkee Park, a 35-acre (14 ha) plot located west of the city center off SR 502. The undeveloped land was donated by a local family in 1997 and meant to be used as a nature trail site. The city planned to use the grounds for a sports complex but the original owners prefer the original trail use idea. As of 2024, the final use of the property is still undecided. Neighboring sites, 4.5-acre (1.8 ha) Remy Park and 13-acre (5.3 ha) Gardner Oaks, are planned to include a variety of playgrounds, pet areas, and fitness and sports related activities. Remy Park, which includes an existing trail, encompasses a total of 80.2 acres (32.5 ha) but the parcel is limited for development. Developed parks include Fairgrounds Park, which hosts several ballfields.

In June 2007, the city of Battle Ground opened a 25,000-square-foot (2,300 m^{2}) skate park in downtown.

== Economy ==
Battle Ground is at the epicenter of the growing Clark County wine industry with three wineries and one tasting room.

The transformer manufacturer Maddox Industrial Transformer was established in Battle Ground in 2015; it has been credited as one of the fastest growing companies in the United States, having benefited from business by datacenters due to the AI boom. The city's newspaper, The Reflector, was purchased by the Spiller brothers of Maddox Industrial Transformer in 2026.

The brothers' increasing influence in the city has faced concerns over their alleged ties to Christian nationalism groups and the "Christian localism" movement. Political conflicts of interest have been raised due to local politicians, such as Battle Ground's mayor as of 2026, being employed by Maddox. Connected employee family members have also served in the city government.

== Education ==
Almost all of Battle Ground is served by the Battle Ground Public Schools, which includes (as of 2025):

- Amboy Middle School (Grades 5–8)
- Battle Ground High School (Grades 9–12)
- Captain Strong Primary School (Grades K-4)
- Chief Umtuch Middle School (Grades 5–8)
- Daybreak Primary School (Grades K-4)
- Daybreak Middle School (Grades 5–8)
- Glenwood Heights Primary School (Grades K-4)
- Laurin Middle School (Grades 5–8)
- Maple Grove Primary School (Grades K-4)
- Pleasant Valley Middle School (Grades 5–8)
- Pleasant Valley Primary School (Grades K-4)
- Prairie High School (Vancouver, Washington) (Grades 9–12)
- Tukes Valley Primary School (Grades K-4)
- Tukes Valley Middle School (Grades 5–8)
- Yacolt Primary School (Grades K-4)

Alternative schools:

- CASEE (Center for Agriculture, Science & Environmental Education)
- Summit View High School – (Grades 9–12)
- River HomeLink (Grades K-12)
- Battle Ground Virtual Academy (Grades K-12)
- CAM Academy (Grades 3–12)

Chief Umtuch Primary School, the city's oldest primary school, was demolished in 2007. Lewisville Middle School was closed in 2007 but is still used for its gym, parking lot, and meetings. The Battle Ground HomeLink program was closed in 2012 and is succeeded by River HomeLink. Maple Grove Middle School was folded into the primary school in 2013 and classes for grades 5-8 were subsequently eliminated, following district boundary adjustments.

A small piece of Battle Ground is in Hockinson School District.

== Transportation ==
Battle Ground is accessed from Interstate 5 at exits 9 and 11 and Interstate 205 at exit 32. State Route 502 and State Route 503 intersect in Battle Ground.

Bus services are provided by the local transit authority, C-Tran, to Downtown Vancouver, Delta Park/Vanport station (served by the MAX Light Rail system), Clark College, Hazel Dell, Yacolt, and the Vancouver Mall. The closest commercial airport to the city is Portland International Airport, situated 18.5 miles (29.8 km) away.

== Notable people ==
- Richie Frahm, professional basketball player
- Tonya Harding, figure skater
- Rob Hotchkiss, musician
- Jonathan Jackson, actor
- Bethany Joy Lenz, actress
- Zia McCabe, musician
- Kaleb McGary, professional football player
- Arnold Riegger, sport shooter and Olympian
- Gerry Staley, professional baseball player
