= Jim Moeller =

American politician (1955–2023)

Speaker pro tempore of the Washington House of Representatives
- In office January 10, 2011 – January 9, 2017
- Preceded by: Jeff Morris
- Succeeded by: Tina Orwall

Member of the Washington House of Representatives from the 49th district
- In office January 13, 2003 – January 9, 2017
- Preceded by: Val Ogden
- Succeeded by: Monica Stonier

Personal details
- Born: James Carl Moeller; July 2, 1955 Vancouver, Washington, U.S.
- Died: March 8, 2023 (aged 67)
- Party: Democratic
- Education: Clark College (attended); Washington State University (BS); Portland State University (attended)

James Carl Moeller (July 2, 1955 – March 8, 2023) was an American politician and mental health professional who served as a member of the Washington State House of Representatives, representing the 49th Legislative District from 2003 to 2017. A member of the Democratic Party, he represented the Clark County communities of Hazel Dell, Walnut Grove, Minnehaha and his native Vancouver.

Rep. Moeller was one of Washington State's first openly gay lawmakers.

During the 2013–14 Washington State House legislative session, he served as speaker pro tempore. He had previously served two terms as deputy speaker pro tempore (2007–10).

Moeller grew up in Vancouver. He went to Clark College and Washington State University, before doing graduate work at Portland State University.

Elected in 1995 to Vancouver City Council, he was re-elected to a second term in 1999. In 2002, when veteran legislator Val Ogden retired, Moeller ran to succeed her in the state House of Representatives. In a hotly contested Democratic primary, Moeller prevailed by less than 1,000 votes – winning 6,564 votes to his opponent's 5,615. He won the subsequent general election handily and took office in January 2003. He was subsequently re-elected at two-year intervals. He attempted to unseat incumbent U.S. Representative Jaime Herrera Beutler in 2016, and lost by 24 points.

Moeller died from complications of Parkinson's disease on March 8, 2023, at the age of 67.

Washington House of Representatives
Preceded by Jeff Morris	Speaker pro tempore of the Washington House of Representatives; 2011–2017	Succeeded by Tina Orwall
