= Hazel Dell, Washington =

- Census-designated place
- Location within Washington (state)
- Coordinates: 45°41′10″N 122°38′22″W
- Country: United States
- State: Washington
- County: Clark

Area
  - Total: 4.85 sq mi (12.56 km^{2})
  - Land: 4.84 sq mi (12.53 km^{2})
  - Water: 0.012 sq mi (0.03 km^{2})
- Elevation: 233 ft (71 m)

Population (2010)
  - Total: 19,435
  - Density: 4,020/sq mi (1,551/km^{2})
- Time zone: UTC-8 (Pacific (PST))
  - Summer (DST): UTC-7 (PDT)
- FIPS code: 53-30305
- GNIS feature ID: 2629813

Hazel Dell is an unincorporated area and census-designated place (CDP) in Clark County, Washington, United States, located north and west of Vancouver. As of the 2020 census, Hazel Dell had a population of 23,569. Previous censuses divided the community into two areas, Hazel Dell North and Hazel Dell South.

== Toponymy and history ==
Oregon Country pioneers Reese and Sarah J. Anderson were Hazel Dell's first settlers. Sarah named the area after a stand of filberts on their land near 78th Street and Highway 99. She also donated the land for the first school in Hazel Dell, the present site of Hazel Dell Elementary School. The name "Bear Gulch" was briefly considered by the early Hazel Dell residents. Local business leaders once considered changing the name to "Basilville" in honor of enterprising merchant Basil Dhanens. With thanks, Dhanens declined the offer. He died in 1972.

Hazel Dell and Minnehaha were two of the first suburban areas to be developed after World War II and were followed by Lake Shore, Felida, and Salmon Creek. Much of the housing boom in the area has subsided due to the increase of homes being built to the east of Vancouver, between Interstate 205 and Camas and Washington State Route 500/Fourth Plain Boulevard and the Columbia River.

Hazel dell was historically an agricultural community and until the early 1970s, it was not uncommon to see horses and dairy cattle at several points along Interstate 5 and Highway 99 in Hazel Dell. Dairy production largely has ceased in the area yet some smaller acreage farms persist. The Clark County 78th Street Heritage Farm is also in Hazel Dell. The Heritage Farm was the county poor farm from the late 1800s until the late 1940s, and Washington State University's Vancouver Research and Extension Unit until 2008, when it was returned to County management as a public agricultural resource used by multiple farm partners including the Clark County Food Bank, WSU Clark County Extension, and Master Gardener Foundation of Clark County. Hazel Dell is increasingly residential and commercial, with multiple shopping centers.

== Geography ==
Hazel Dell runs parallel to and is bisected by Interstate 5, with access from exits 4 and 5. The community is bounded by the Vancouver city limits on the south in the vicinity of Burnt Bridge Creek, Lake Shore to the west, Salmon Creek to the north, I-205/Barberton to the northeast, and Walnut Grove to the east. Vancouver Lake is a short distance to the west of the area, and the community of Minnehaha is to the southeast. According to the United States Census Bureau, the Hazel Dell CDP has a total area of 4.9 square miles (12.6 km^{2}), of which 0.01 square miles (0.03 km^{2}), or 0.27%, is water.

== Demographics ==
Historical population
Census	Pop.	Note	%±
2010	19,435		—
2020	23,569		21.3%
U.S. Decennial Census; 2000 2010

Hazel Dell first appeared as a census designated place in the 2010 U.S. census formed out of the deleted Hazel Dell North and Hazel Dell South CDPs.

=== Racial and ethnic composition ===
Hazel Dell CDP, Washington – Racial and ethnic composition Note: the US Census treats Hispanic/Latino as an ethnic category. This table excludes Latinos from the racial categories and assigns them to a separate category. Hispanics/Latinos may be of any race.
Race / Ethnicity (NH = Non-Hispanic)	Pop 2010	Pop 2020	% 2010	% 2020
White alone (NH)	15,112	15,936	77.76%	67.61%
Black or African American alone (NH)	486	823	2.50%	3.49%
Native American or Alaska Native alone (NH)	134	169	0.69%	0.72%
Asian alone (NH)	715	1,069	3.68%	4.54%
Native Hawaiian or Pacific Islander alone (NH)	122	293	0.63%	1.24%
Other race alone (NH)	24	125	0.12%	0.53%
Mixed race or Multiracial (NH)	699	1,661	3.60%	7.05%
Hispanic or Latino (any race)	2,143	3,493	11.03%	14.82%
Total	19,435	23,569	100.00%	100.00%

=== 2020 census ===
As of the 2020 census, Hazel Dell had a population of 23,569. The median age was 36.7 years. 21.8% of residents were under the age of 18 and 15.7% of residents were 65 years of age or older. For every 100 females there were 97.1 males, and for every 100 females age 18 and over there were 95.2 males age 18 and over.

100.0% of residents lived in urban areas, while 0.0% lived in rural areas.

There were 9,272 households in Hazel Dell, of which 29.9% had children under the age of 18 living in them. Of all households, 41.2% were married-couple households, 20.4% were households with a male householder and no spouse or partner present, and 28.0% were households with a female householder and no spouse or partner present. About 27.8% of all households were made up of individuals and 11.2% had someone living alone who was 65 years of age or older.

There were 9,602 housing units, of which 3.4% were vacant. The homeowner vacancy rate was 1.0% and the rental vacancy rate was 4.2%.

Racial composition as of the 2020 census
Race	Number	Percent
White	16,640	70.6%
Black or African American	858	3.6%
American Indian and Alaska Native	295	1.3%
Asian	1,088	4.6%
Native Hawaiian and Other Pacific Islander	298	1.3%
Some other race	1,688	7.2%
Two or more races	2,702	11.5%

== Arts and culture ==
Every third Saturday in May since 1964, Hazel Dell has hosted the "Parade of Bands". The parade route travels on Highway 99. The event was first organized and sponsored by Harvey Johnson and family who owned the former Steakburger Drive-in restaurant on Highway 99.

== Parks and recreation ==
Construction of Kate and Clarence LaLonde Neighborhood Park was to begin in early July 2010.

Other parks located in the city include Hazel Dell Community Park, Jorgenson Park, and Tenny Creek Neighborhood Park, which was developed in 2007.

== Government services ==
Law enforcement for the community of Hazel Dell is provided by the Clark County Sheriff's Office, and the local crime rate is typical for a neighborhood of its size and population density. Fire Station 61 operates as part of Clark County Fire District 6 and provides firefighting services to Hazel Dell and neighboring communities. Hazel Dell has its own sewer district as well.

== Education ==
=== K-12 ===
Most of Hazel Dell is in Vancouver Public Schools. A small portion is located in Battle Ground School District.

Three elementary schools are located in the community. Hazel Dell Elementary School is a kindergarten through 5th grade elementary school located in south Hazel Dell and is part of the Vancouver School District. The school is home to the "Panthers". The current principal is Lisa Reed. Sacajawea Elementary School is a kindergarten through 5th grade elementary school located within a residential area of northwest Hazel Dell, and is part of the Vancouver School District. The school is home to the "Skyhawks". Sarah J. Anderson Elementary School is a kindergarten through 5th grade elementary school located within a residential area of northeast Hazel Dell and is part of the Vancouver School District. The school is home to the "Pioneers". The current principal is Katie Arkoosh.

Columbia River High School is a 9th through 12th grade high school located within the residential area of Hazel Dell. The school's moniker was formerly known as the Chieftains but the name was changed to the Rapids in 2021.
