= Val Ogden =

American educator and politician (1924–2014)

Speaker pro tempore of the Washington House of Representatives
- In office January 11, 1999 – January 13, 2003 Serving with John Pennington (1999–2002)
- Preceded by: John Pennington
- Succeeded by: John Lovick

Member of the Washington House of Representatives from the 49th district
- In office January 14, 1991 – January 13, 2003
- Preceded by: Busse Nutley
- Succeeded by: Jim Moeller

Personal details
- Born: Valeria Juan Munson; February 9, 1924 Okanogan, Washington, U.S.
- Died: April 9, 2014 (aged 90) Vancouver, Washington
- Party: Democratic
- Education: Washington State University (BA)

Valeria Juan Ogden (née Munson; February 9, 1924 – April 9, 2014) was an American politician, management consultant, and educator.

== Biography ==
Born in Okanogan, Washington, Ogden received her bachelor's degree in sociology from Washington State University. She worked as a non-profit management consultant and adjunct professor at Lewis & Clark College and Portland State University. Ogden served in the Washington House of Representatives from 1991 until 2003 as a Democrat and served as Speaker Pro Tempore. She served six terms as State Representative. Ogden died of cancer in 2014.

She married Dan Ogden in 1946. They met while attending Washington State University in Pullman, Washington. The couple had three children, Jan, Patti, and Dan.

During her 12 years as State Representative, Ogden fought for state-run schools for the blind and deaf. Ogden pushed to improve standards of students learning braille and instructors teaching braille at the Washington State School for the Blind. Proud graduates of Washington State University, Val and Dan helped to bring the branch campus to Vancouver. The Washington State University Vancouver campus was established in 1989. The entire Ogden family is deeply rooted in Washington State University; Val, Dan, two of their children, and two of their grandchildren have received degrees.

She served as executive director of YWCA Clark County from 1985 to 1989. While serving as State Representative, she directed $300,000 of funds for the YWCA's capital campaign.

She was involved in the non-profit Camp Fire USA, doing national consulting for Camp Fire Girls. Ogden was an expert in non-profits and was often consulted for help when Camp Fire and other agencies needed help.

Ogden was active with several civic groups, including the Council on the Homeless, Human Services Council, the Clark County Mental Health Board, and Southwest Washington Center for the Arts.

== Honors and awards ==
In 2006, she received Clark County's First Citizen award.
