= Barberton =

Barberton may refer to:

- Barberton, Mpumalanga, South Africa
- Barberton, Ohio, United States
- Barberton, Washington, United States
- Barberton, Western Australia
- Barberton Greenstone Belt
