= Portlandia season 2 =

Portlandia
- Season 2
- Starring: Fred Armisen; Carrie Brownstein
- No. of episodes: 10

Release
- Original network: IFC
- Original release: January 6 – March 9, 2012

Season chronology
- ← Previous; Season 1 Next → Season 3

The second season of the television comedy Portlandia premiered on IFC in the United States on January 6 and ended on March 9, 2012 with a total of 10 episodes.

== Production ==
On February 14, 2011, a second season of ten episodes was ordered and began airing on January 6, 2012, at 10 pm ET/PT. Guest stars for this season include Penny Marshall, Jack McBrayer, Tim Robbins, Robin Pecknold, Andy Samberg, Joanna Newsom, Amber Tamblyn, Mary Lynn Rajskub, Kristen Wiig, Edward James Olmos, James Callis, St. Vincent, Isaac Brock, LaMarcus Aldridge, Shohreh Aghdashloo, Ed Begley, Jr., Jeff Goldblum, Sean Hayes, Miranda July, Kumail Nanjiani, Eddie Vedder and Ronald D. Moore.

Season 2, episode 3 of Portlandia included the sketch "No Grocery Bag" which was filmed at a Zupan's Markets store. The sketch spoofed the consumption of organic food, as well as Portland's ban on plastic bags.

== Cast ==
=== Main cast ===
- Fred Armisen
- Carrie Brownstein

=== Special guest cast ===
- Kyle MacLachlan as Mr. Mayor

=== Guest stars ===
- Andy Samberg as Mixologist
- Kumail Nanjiani as SoCal Waiter
- Ehren McGhehey as Pickle Seller and Motorcycle Man^{a}
- James Callis as himself
- Jeff Goldblum as Alan
- Ronald D. Moore as Ken Reynolds
- Edward James Olmos as himself
- Eddie Vedder as himself
- Shoreh Aghdashloo as Nelofar Jamshidi
- Jack McBrayer as Zupan's Customer
- Sean Hayes as himself
- Isaac Brock as Record Donator
- Annie Clark as herself
- Kristen Wiig as Gathy
- Miranda July as Two, Two Shirts Owner
- Amber Tamblyn as Intern
- Joanna Newsom as Harpist
- Robin Pecknold as Hippie
- LaMarcus Aldridge as himself
- Penny Marshall as Barbara
- Greg Louganis as himself
- Johnny Marr as himself
- Tim Robbins as Excellency
- Ed Begley, Jr. as himself
- Steve Jones as Hammersmith

a Also has an uncredited role as Man in Line in "Brunch Village".

== Episodes ==
No. overall	No. in season	Title	Directed by	Written by	Original release date
7	1	"Mixologist"	Jonathan Krisel	Fred Armisen, Carrie Brownstein, Karey Dornetto, Jonathan Krisel	January 6, 2012
Carrie is attracted to a cool bartender and pursues him to "SoCal".
8	2	"One Moore Episode"	Jonathan Krisel	Fred Armisen, Carrie Brownstein, Karey Dornetto, Jonathan Krisel	January 13, 2012
Doug and Claire become obsessed with Battlestar Galactica and solicit the cast and crew to make a new episode.
9	3	"Cool Wedding"	Jonathan Krisel	Fred Armisen, Carrie Brownstein, Karey Dornetto, Jonathan Krisel	January 20, 2012
Spike and Iris plan, then cancel, their wedding.
10	4	"Grover"	Jonathan Krisel	Fred Armisen, Carrie Brownstein, Karey Dornetto, Jonathan Krisel	January 27, 2012
A couple work to get their son into a private preschool. The "Dial Tones" play for the DMV hold line.
11	5	"Cops Redesign"	Jonathan Krisel	Fred Armisen, Carrie Brownstein, Karey Dornetto, Jonathan Krisel	February 3, 2012
The mayor asks Fred and Carrie to redesign the Portland Police Department's uniforms to improve their image.
12	6	"Cat Nap"	Jonathan Krisel	Fred Armisen, Carrie Brownstein, Karey Dornetto, Jonathan Krisel	February 10, 2012
After achieving success by including their cat in their band, "Cat Nap" is kidnapped by an obsessed fan. Toni and Candace hire an intern for the Feminist Bookstore.
13	7	"Motorcycle"	Jonathan Krisel	Fred Armisen, Carrie Brownstein, Karey Dornetto, Jonathan Krisel	February 17, 2012
Peter and Nance try to spice things up after a passerby calls Peter "old man".
14	8	"Feminist Bookstore's 10th Anniversary"	Jonathan Krisel	Fred Armisen, Carrie Brownstein, Karey Dornetto, Jonathan Krisel	February 24, 2012
The Feminist Bookstore has an anniversary celebration with entertainment by blues artists Angel Bouchet and Sonny Hess, but the party is upset when an old partner shows up, bringing LaMarcus Aldridge as her boyfriend. The Sanitation Twins explain recycling.
15	9	"No Olympics"	Jonathan Krisel	Fred Armisen, Carrie Brownstein, Karey Dornetto, Jonathan Krisel	March 2, 2012
Fred and Carrie convince the mayor that the Olympics should be barred from Portland. The Mayor sings the Portland anthem.
16	10	"Brunch Village"	Jonathan Krisel	Fred Armisen, Carrie Brownstein, Karey Dornetto, Jonathan Krisel, Bill Oakley	March 9, 2012
Peter and Nance, Fred and Carrie, the mayor and most of the city of Portland converge on a new brunch spot, much to the annoyance of Toni and Candace. Guest stars, Ed Begley Jr., Tim Robbins.
