= Firstenburg Family Fountain =

Fountain in Vancouver, Washington, U.S.

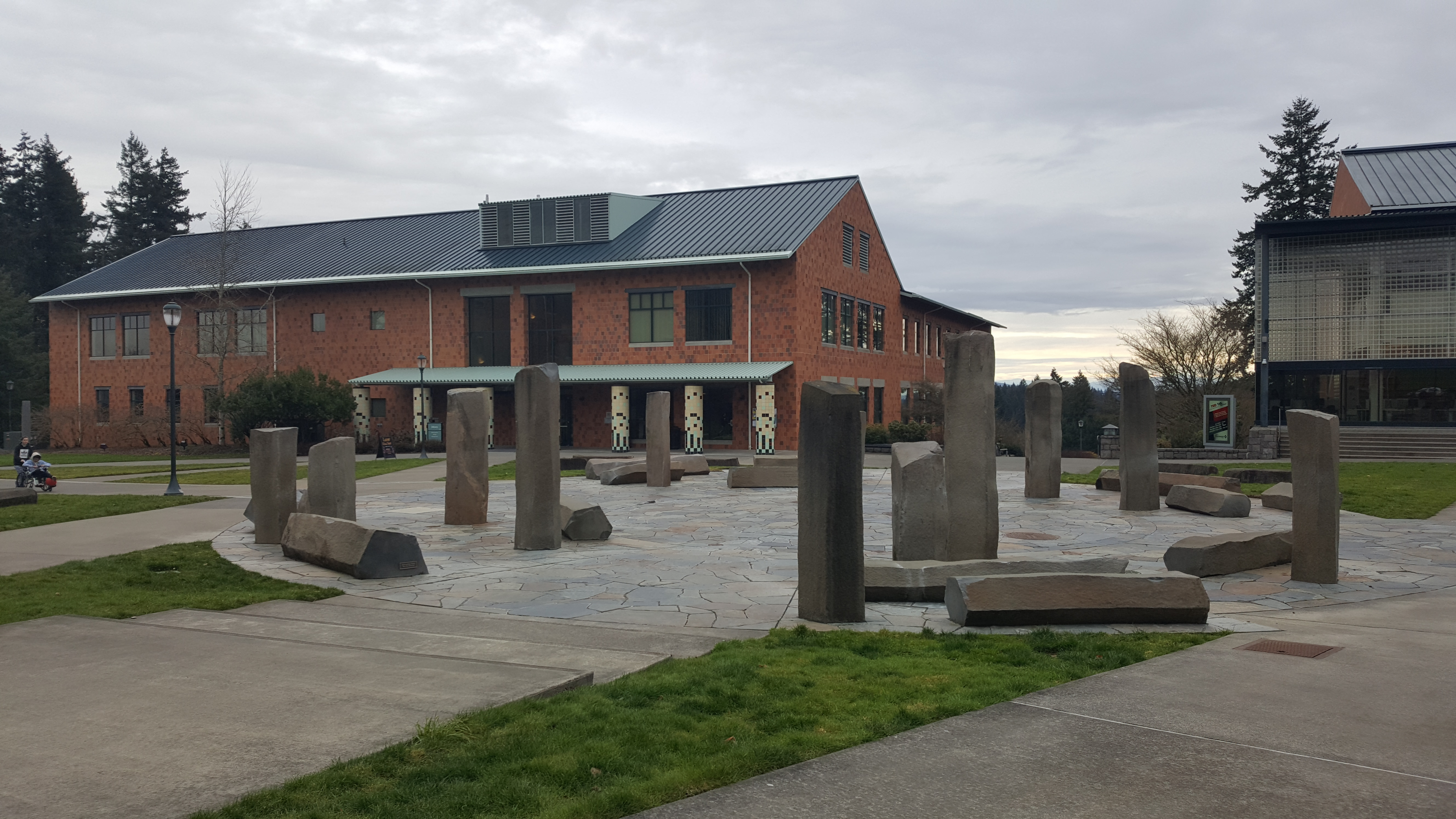
- The fountain in 2019
- Medium: Basalt
- Location: Vancouver, Washington
- 45.73096°N 122.63686°W
- Website: Firstenburg Family Fountain, Washington State University Vancouver

The Firstenburg Family Fountain is an outdoor fountain, installed within a plaza in the center of the Washington State University Vancouver (WSUV) campus, in Vancouver, Washington, United States.

== Description and history ==
The fountain was funded by Ed and Mary Firstenburg, who donated $500,000. The fountain has basalt columns and slabs, and is one of several donated by the Firstenburgs in Vancouver. The fountain won a Community Pride Design Award in 2001.

Hal Dengerink, WSU Vancouver's founding chancellor, called the fountain "a permanent legacy for the Firstenburg family and for WSU Vancouver". The Columbian's Calley Hair has described the fountain as "eye-catching, with rough-hewn slabs of basalt and plenty of seating to relax and enjoy the view".

In 2011, students gathered at the fountain to protest tuition increases. The plaza was the site of a Patriot Prayer rally and counter protest in October 2018.
