= Lake Shore, Washington =

- Census-designated place
- Location of Lake Shore, Washington
- Coordinates: 45°41′28″N 122°41′28″W
- Country: United States
- State: Washington
- County: Clark

Area
  - Total: 1.64 sq mi (4.25 km^{2})
  - Land: 1.64 sq mi (4.25 km^{2})
  - Water: 0 sq mi (0.0 km^{2})
- Elevation: 217 ft (66 m)

Population (2020)
  - Total: 7,056
  - Density: 4,300/sq mi (1,660/km^{2})
- Time zone: UTC-8 (Pacific (PST))
  - Summer (DST): UTC-7 (PDT)
- FIPS code: 53-37830
- GNIS feature ID: 2408552

Lake Shore is a census-designated place (CDP) in Clark County, Washington, United States. The population was 7,056 at the 2020 census.

Based on per capita income, one of the more reliable measures of affluence, Lake Shore ranks 124th of 614 areas in the state of Washington to be ranked.

== Geography ==
Lake Shore is located in southwestern Clark County on the east side of Vancouver Lake. The community is bordered to the northwest by Felida, to the northeast by Salmon Creek, to the southeast by Hazel Dell, and to the south by the city of Vancouver.

According to the United States Census Bureau, the Lake Shore CDP has a total area of 1.64 square miles (4.25 km^{2}), all of it land.

== Demographics ==
Historical population
Census	Pop.	Note	%±
1990	6,268		—
2000	6,670		6.4%
2010	6,571		−1.5%
2020	7,056		7.4%

Lake Shore first appeared as a census designated place in the 1990 U.S. census.

=== Racial and ethnic composition ===
Lake Shore CDP, Washington – Racial and ethnic composition Note: the US Census treats Hispanic/Latino as an ethnic category. This table excludes Latinos from the racial categories and assigns them to a separate category. Hispanics/Latinos may be of any race.
Race / Ethnicity (NH = Non-Hispanic)	Pop 1990	Pop 2000	Pop 2010	Pop 2020	% 1990	% 2000	% 2010	% 2020
White alone (NH)	5,855	6,019	5,785	5,693	93.41%	90.24%	88.04%	80.68%
Black or African American alone (NH)	55	79	55	65	0.88%	1.18%	0.84%	0.92%
Native American or Alaska Native alone (NH)	52	42	31	45	0.83%	0.63%	0.47%	0.64%
Asian alone (NH)	163	162	185	228	2.60%	2.43%	2.82%	3.23%
Native Hawaiian or Pacific Islander alone (NH)	x	5	25	36	x	0.07%	0.38%	0.51%
Other race alone (NH)	5	15	15	32	0.08%	0.22%	0.23%	0.45%
Mixed race or Multiracial (NH)	x	154	179	427	x	2.31%	2.72%	6.05%
Hispanic or Latino (any race)	138	194	296	530	2.20%	2.91%	4.50%	7.51%
Total	6,268	6,670	6,571	7,056	100.00%	100.00%	100.00%	100.00%

=== 2000 census ===
As of the census of 2000, there were 6,670 people, 2,355 households, and 1,940 families residing in the CDP. The population density was 4,110.1 inhabitants per square mile (1,586.9/km^{2}). There were 2,415 housing units at an average density of 1,488.2 per square mile (574.6/km^{2}). The racial makeup of the CDP was 92.38% White, 1.20% African American, 0.72% Native American, 2.46% Asian, 0.07% Pacific Islander, 0.67% from other races, and 2.49% from two or more races. Hispanic or Latino of any race were 2.91% of the population. 21.7% were of German, 11.9% English, 8.8% Irish, 6.8% Norwegian and 5.6% American ancestry according to Census 2000.

There were 2,355 households, out of which 36.4% had children under the age of 18 living with them, 70.6% were married couples living together, 8.6% had a female householder with no husband present, and 17.6% were non-families. 13.2% of all households were made up of individuals, and 5.0% had someone living alone who was 65 years of age or older. The average household size was 2.83 and the average family size was 3.09.

In the CDP, the age distribution of the population shows 27.7% under the age of 18, 6.4% from 18 to 24, 26.1% from 25 to 44, 29.4% from 45 to 64, and 10.4% who were 65 years of age or older. The median age was 39 years. For every 100 females, there were 100.3 males. For every 100 females age 18 and over, there were 96.9 males.

The median income for a household in the CDP was $62,476, and the median income for a family was $66,217. Males had a median income of $48,716 versus $35,300 for females. The per capita income for the CDP was $27,008. About 3.6% of families and 3.3% of the population were below the poverty line, including 3.9% of those under age 18 and 6.4% of those age 65 or over.

== Education ==
It is within Vancouver Public Schools.
