= Zupan's Markets =

American gourmet grocer

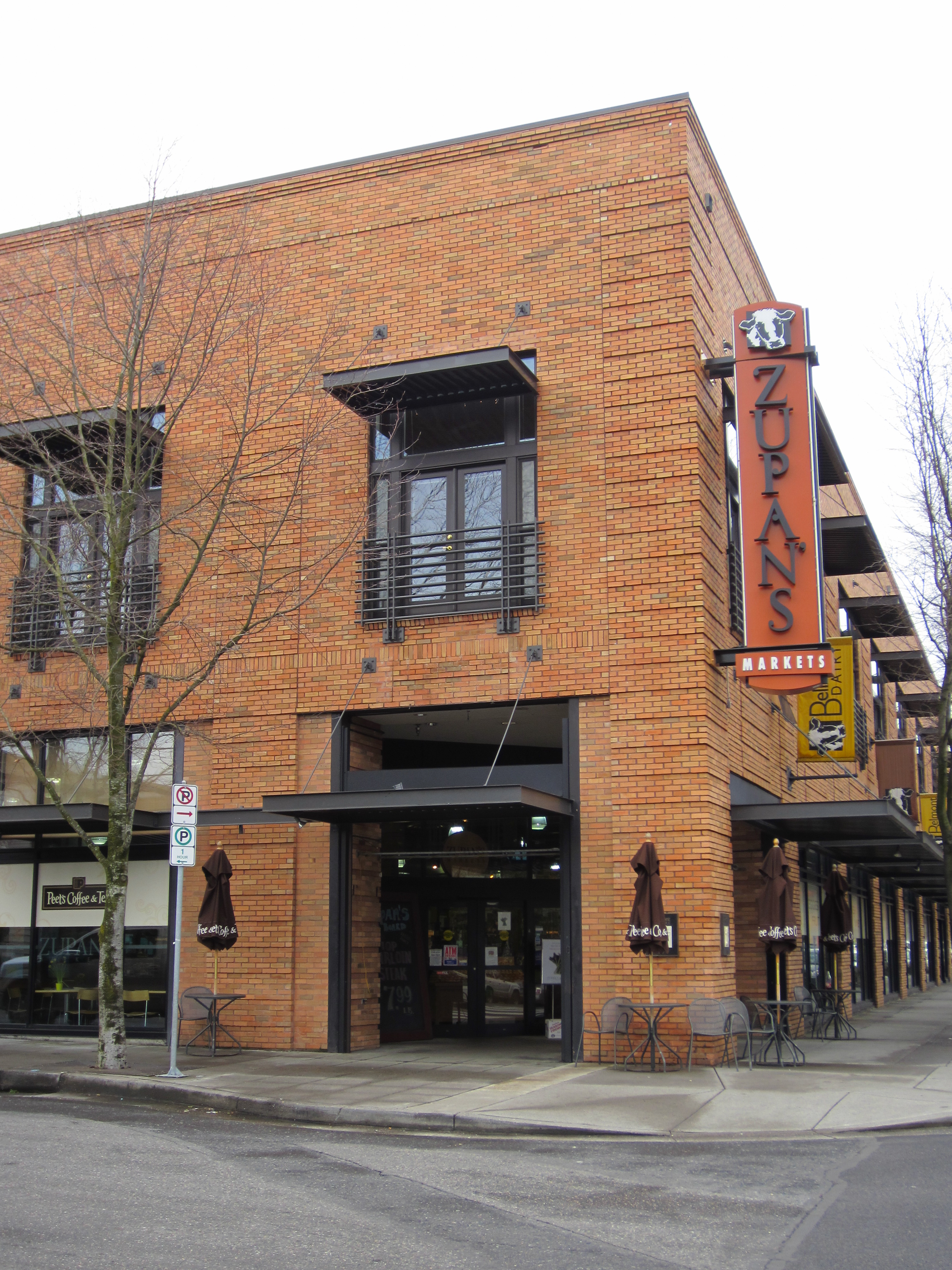
- The Zupan's Markets location on Belmont Street, 2012
- Company type: Grocer
- Industry: Retail sales
- Founded: 1974
- Headquarters: Portland, Oregon, U.S.
- Number of locations: 3
- Key people: Mike Zupan, President
- Products: Local and global foods, produce, home goods, flowers

Zupan's Markets is a family-owned neighborhood gourmet grocer serving the Portland, Oregon metropolitan area with food and wine from local and global sources. The business was established by John Zupan in 1975, and his son Mike later became president.

Zupan's Markets has also operated Food World stores in Oregon and Washington, as well as four Food Pavilion stores. There have been six Zupan's Markets locations, with three currently operating in the Portland metropolitan area.

== History ==
At the age of 16, John Zupan began work as a courtesy clerk at Sheridan Fruit. He spent subsequent years working in produce—logging eleven years at Fred Meyer working under Meyer himself as the produce manager and produce district manager—before buying his first two stores in the Portland area. He opened the first Zupan's Market store on Burnside in 1975. Zupan's was later run by John's son Mike, who joined the company at age 22, and later became director of operations, while John focused on the real estate aspects of the business. John, while semi-retired, remained involved in the company until his death in 2011.

The Oregonian noted that John Zupan's skill was in "presenting fresh foods in ways that set them apart from much-larger competitors". In 1996, Progressive Grocer noted that Zupan's sought to entice customers to buy more produce by making freshly cut fruit available to customers for sampling all day. A competitor, City Market in northeast Portland, later noted that Zupan's had hurt their produce business in the 1990s.

According to The Columbian in Vancouver, Washington, over the years Zupan's has evolved from "garden variety supermarkets" to "stylish markets for patrons of fine ingredients". As of 2003, Zupan's Markets had five stores and 300 employees, about 75% of whom worked full time, and had annual revenues of over $50 million. In 2004, Zupan's became the first chain food retailer to partner with San Leandro-based Italian specialty retailer and importer A.G. Ferrari Foods. As of 2010, Zupan's was producing the magazine Indulge. The company has stocked bottles and growler taps, and has partnered with Commons Brewery. Zupan's has also collaborated with Portland Roasting Company. In 2015, the company was slated to test digitally controlled dog houses at its stores, as part of a promotion with Portland Pet Food Co. All three stores offered the dog houses for rent, as of 2019. The stores' beer, wine, and cheese tastings have been popular with customers. In 2023, Zupan's launched a menu for Hanukkah.

In 2009, the Taste of Zupan's event, in partnership with The Sunshine Division, provided more than 500 food boxes to families in need. Zupan's regularly works in partnership with the Portland Police Bureau's Project Ray of Hope to collect non-perishable foods for families.

== Locations ==
=== Current ===
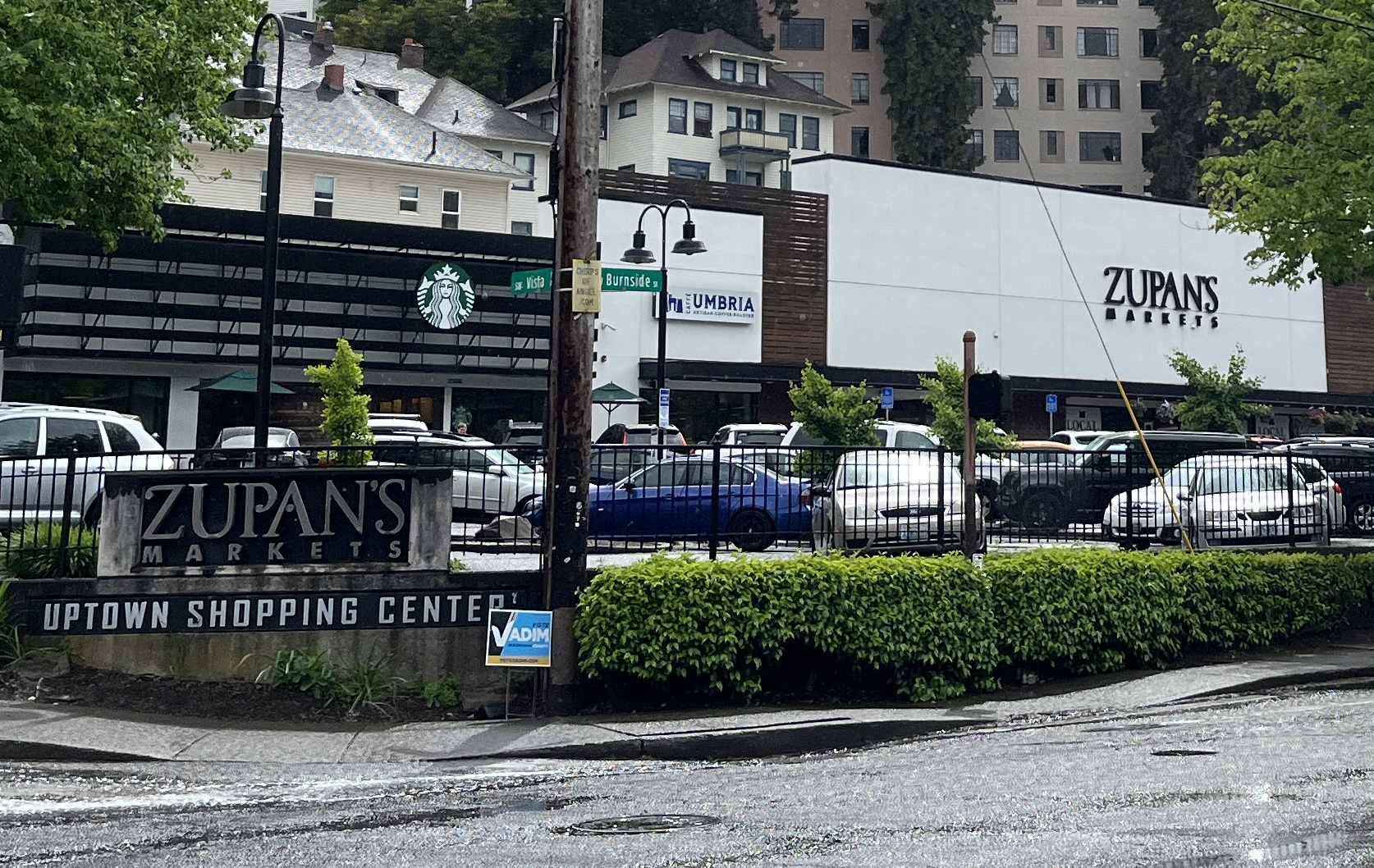
The store on Burnside Street, 2024

Zupan's has three locations in the Portland metropolitan area. In Portland, the Burnside Street store has a bakery, a delicatessen, a meat counter, and a selection of wines, and the business also operates on Macadam Avenue in south Portland. The Lake Oswego location operates within the Lake Grove Village development.

=== Former ===
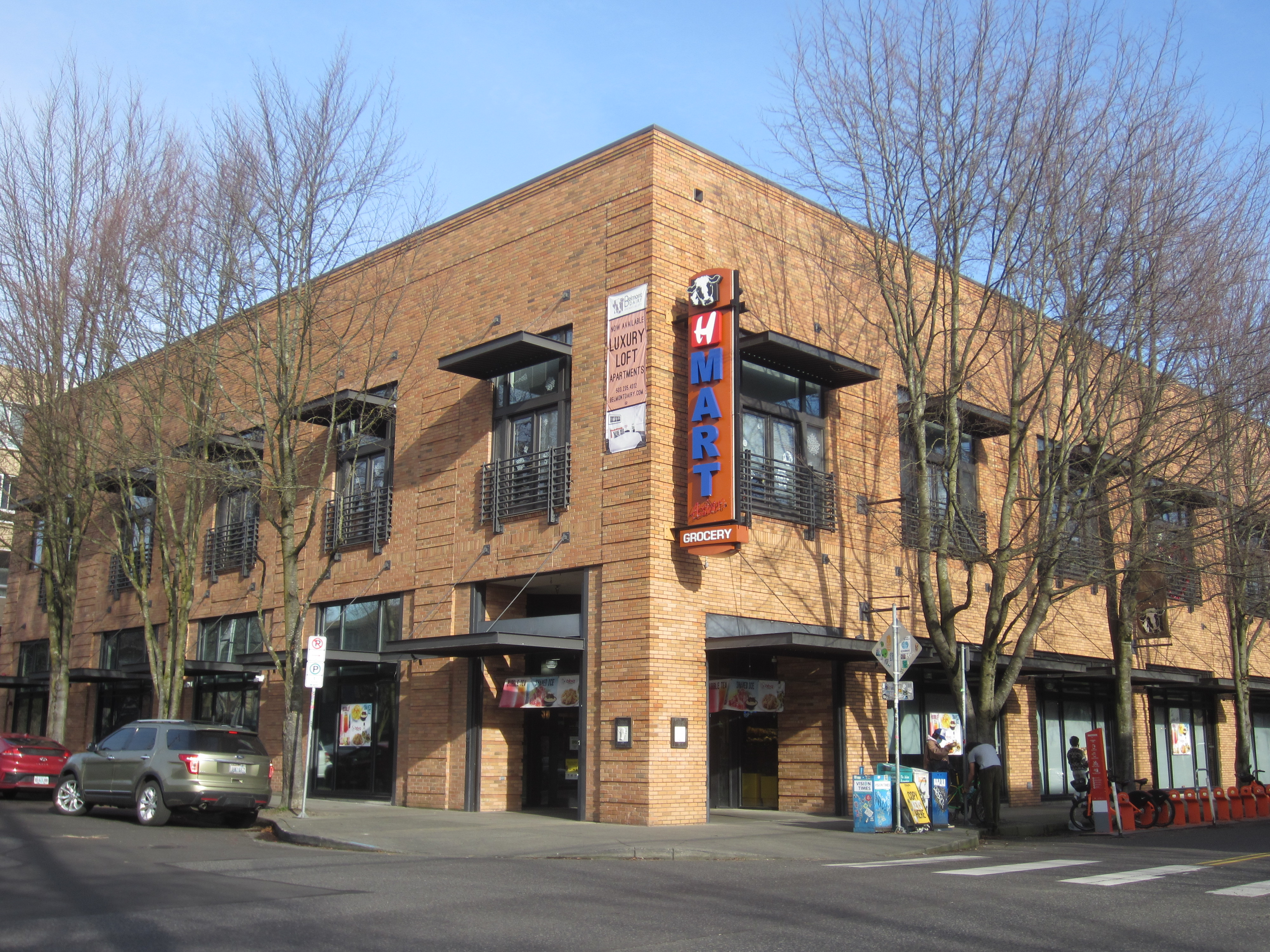
The Belmont location became an H Mart (pictured in 2021).

There have been as many as eight Zupan's stores. In the 1990s, the company also operated Food World stores in Roseburg, Oregon, and Clark County, Washington, as well as four Food Pavilion stores in Washington and Oregon. Two stores in Vancouver, Washington, were sold in the mid-1990s.

Zupan's operated a store on Hayden Island from 2003 to 2006. The building had structural issues and remained vacant, as of 2023.

In Salmon Creek, Washington, the Zupan's store was demolished in 2000 and replaced by a Safeway location. The store in Raleigh Hills, Oregon, closed in 2009.

A "colorful" and "trendy" fourth store in the Belmont District of southeast Portland was closed in January 2017. It had occupied the site of Belmont Dairy, an ice cream and milk plant completed in 1910, and was part of a project to promote mixed-use development in a high-poverty neighborhood which later became a "poster child for Portland's thriving retail and restaurant scene" according to Oregon Business. The building was later occupied by H Mart.

== Reception ==
A 2019 article in The Oregonian about family-owned businesses with deep roots in Portland featured Zupan's, comparing it to a farmers' market focused on quality that tries to "indulge the senses".

Zupan's was included in Tasting Table's 2022 overview of the fourteen best grocery stores of the Pacific Northwest. In 2023, the company ranked seventh in The Daily Meal's overview of the twelve best grocery store deli counters, receiving recognition for its breakfast burritos, smoked tri-tip sandwiches on focaccia, artisan baguettes (with ham, dijon, butter, and gruyere cheese), lobster rolls, and red chile pork tamales.

Although Eater Seattle compared Zupan's Markets to PCC Community Markets or Madison Market in Seattle in 2012, it later published a reader comment that they were more like the latter rather than the former, saying, "It's a place where one can buy flavorless strawberries in a cute little pint sized basket for $7 and take a bottle from the 20 foot Veuve Clicquot tower."

== In popular culture ==
The Zupan's Markets store in Belmont was the location for the comedy sketch, "No Grocery Bag", in the comedy TV series Portlandia, which aired in 2012. The sketch was a spoof of Portland's ban on plastic bags, and also pointed out the irony of the characters' "calculated consumption" of luxury organic food.

== See also ==
- List of grocers
