= Portlandia season 3 =

Portlandia
- Season 3
- DVD cover
- Starring: Fred Armisen; Carrie Brownstein
- No. of episodes: 11

Release
- Original network: IFC
- Original release: December 14, 2012 – March 1, 2013

Season chronology
- ← Previous; Season 2 Next → Season 4

The third season of the television comedy Portlandia aired on IFC in the United States on December 14, 2012 and concluded on March 1, 2013, consisting a total of 11 episodes with the season kicking off with a special Christmas episode.

== Cast ==
=== Main cast ===
- Fred Armisen
- Carrie Brownstein

=== Special guest cast ===
- Kyle MacLachlan as Mr. Mayor

=== Recurring cast ===
- Chloë Sevigny as Alexandra

=== Guest stars ===
- Jim Gaffigan as Donald
- Matt Lucas as Stu
- Bobby Moynihan as Robert
- Jack White as himself
- Lance Bangs as himself (uncredited)
- Kurt Loder as himself
- Matt Pinfield as himself
- Tabitha Soren as herself
- Jeff Goldblum as The Doily Shoppe Proprietor
- Martina Navratilova as herself
- No Doubt as themselves
- Kumail Nanjiani as Birthday Loan Officer and Oregon Power Employee
- Mike O'Brien
- Patton Oswalt as Thor83
- Maria Thayer
- Matt Berry as Squiggleman
- Juliette Lewis as Darcy
- Roseanne Barr as The New Mayor
- J. Mascis as himself
- George Wendt as George Heely
- Dirty Projectors as themselves
- Rose Byrne as Fred's Girlfriend
- John Levenstein as the voice of John The Rat
- Bill Hader as Birdman

== Episodes ==
No. overall	No. in season	Title	Directed by	Written by	Original release date
17	1	"Winter in Portlandia"	Jonathan Krisel	Fred Armisen, Carrie Brownstein, Jonathan Krisel, Bill Oakley	December 14, 2012
A Portlandia Christmas episode. Bohemian couple Peter and Nance struggle to keep off winter weight, putting Peter into pasta withdrawal. Candace's son visits the feminist bookstore during the holidays. Artisan curators Bryce and Lisa offer a winter vacation at their newly opened Outlet Hotel. A basement recording studio outfitted with gear from Pet Sounds.
18	2	"Take Back MTV"	Jonathan Krisel	Fred Armisen, Carrie Brownstein, Jonathan Krisel, Bill Oakley	January 4, 2013
Iris and Spyke rustle up a gang of former MTV personalities in an attempt to wrestle the cable music channel from the tween set. Sandra develops a crush on a guy in her meditation class, and Kath and Dave shoot a video about how to construct a tent.
19	3	"Missionaries"	Jonathan Krisel	Fred Armisen, Carrie Brownstein, Jonathan Krisel, Bill Oakley	January 4, 2013
The Mayor (Kyle MacLachlan) recruits Fred and Carrie to go door-to-door in Seattle to entice residents to relocate to Portland. A pedicab driver rustles up riders. Peter and Nance make a stop at the Doily Shoppe in preparation for the opening of their bed and breakfast (B 'n B), and Toni and Candace try to find out who's behind a bad online review of their book store.
20	4	"Nina's Birthday"	Jonathan Krisel	Fred Armisen, Carrie Brownstein, Jonathan Krisel, Bill Oakley	January 11, 2013
Nina throws herself an extravagant birthday party that will include horseback rides, sunrise yoga and a tapas dinner, which thrills Kath and Dave, who've just returned from Spain and are eager to share their knowledge of all things Iberian. A couple who've attended so many birthday parties in the past year that they're broke seek a bank loan in order to afford to make an appearance at Nina's soiree.
21	5	"Squiggleman"	Jonathan Krisel	Fred Armisen, Carrie Brownstein, Jonathan Krisel, Bill Oakley	January 18, 2013
Concerned parents put together a band that plays music for children. The Portland Nerd Council produces a public-service announcement. Meanwhile, a couple have an uneasy lunch at a vegan restaurant, and the Feminist Bookstore holds a comedy night.
22	6	"Off the Grid"	Jonathan Krisel	Fred Armisen, Carrie Brownstein, Jonathan Krisel, Bill Oakley	January 25, 2013
The Mayor steps down after being involved in an environmental scandal, and "The Battle of the Gentle Bands" is waged by local musicians. Meanwhile, an inspector stops by Peter and Nance's bed and breakfast, and the Gutterpunks try to locate a missing cat.
23	7	"The Temp"	Jonathan Krisel	Fred Armisen, Carrie Brownstein, Jonathan Krisel, Bill Oakley	February 1, 2013
Portland's interim mayor hopes to turn the position into a full-time job with help from Fred and Carrie, while a couple experience wedding interruptus; town baristas devise a coffee shop manifesto. Later, Kath and Dave have problems finding seats at a restaurant; Joaquin's friends get to the bottom of his mysterious disappearances, and the Rats become authors.
24	8	"Soft Opening"	Jonathan Krisel	Fred Armisen, Carrie Brownstein, Jonathan Krisel, Bill Oakley	February 8, 2013
Peter and Nance prep for the opening of their bed and breakfast by hosting their friends; a local furnituremaker is featured in "The Man Issue" of a magazine. Meanwhile, the Steampunks head to a convention, while an emboldened Fred takes a date out for a third time.
25	9	"Alexandra"	Jonathan Krisel	Fred Armisen, Carrie Brownstein, Jonathan Krisel, Bill Oakley	February 15, 2013
Carrie and Fred's roommate complicates their relationship. Portland is overrun with art projects. A movie theater sells artisanal concessions. Coyotes are threatening Kath and Dave's neighborhood. Visitors tour the Historical Punk Society. Jean-Luc Godard and French New Wave are a motif.
26	10	"No-Fo-O-Fo-Bridge"	Jonathan Krisel	Fred Armisen, Carrie Brownstein, Jonathan Krisel, Bill Oakley	February 22, 2013
The Rats relocate from their recently gentrified neighborhood. First time parents peruse child rearing manuals, and Gahvin takes his girlfriend to a movie. Alexandra and Carrie dine at a communal table.
27	11	"Blackout"	Jonathan Krisel	Fred Armisen, Carrie Brownstein, Jonathan Krisel, Bill Oakley	March 1, 2013
Electricity is shut off for the entire city of Portland due to unpaid bills at the Mayor's office. Peter and Nance have a mysterious guest at their bed and breakfast. Kath and Dave go into survival mode. Fred and Carrie team up to find Mr. Mayor and restore power to the city.
