= Portlandia season 8 =

Portlandia
- Season 8
- No. of episodes: 10

Release
- Original network: IFC
- Original release: January 18 – March 22, 2018

Season chronology
- ← Previous; Season 7

The eighth and final season of the sketch comedy series Portlandia premiered on IFC in the United States on January 18 and ended on March 22, 2018 with a total of 10 episodes. The series stars Fred Armisen and Carrie Brownstein.

== Cast ==
=== Main cast ===
- Fred Armisen
- Carrie Brownstein

=== Special guest ===
- Kyle MacLachlan as Mr. Mayor / Sean

=== Guest stars ===
- Sam Adams as Sam
- Scott Adsit as Josh
- Ed Begley, Jr. as Wes, Doctor
- Rachel Bloom as Rachel
- Aidy Bryant as Toni and Candace’s patient
- Brendan Canty as Riot Spray drummer
- John Corbett as himself
- Terry Crews as Border Guard Crews
- Dan Gregor as Rachel’s date
- Jeff Goldblum as Derek
- Cherry Jones as Ms. Mayor / Margaret
- Rashida Jones as Amanda
- Andy Kindler as Dr. Benz
- Nick Kroll as Gil Faizon
- John Levenstein as John the Rat
- Natasha Lyonne as Club heckler
- John Mulaney as George St. Geegland
- Kumail Nanjiani as Disaster Hut employee
- Krist Novoselic as Riot Spray bassist
- Henry Rollins as Riot Spray singer
- Tracee Ellis Ross as Photo booth coach
- Cheryl Strayed as herself
- Tessa Thompson as Bailey
- David Wain as Brad
- Dolly Wells as Dolly
- Shannon Woodward as Shannon
- Kurt Vile as Kurt

== Production ==
The series was originally renewed through 2017 with season 7 intended to be the last, but Armisen and Brownstein hinted at the possibility of doing season 8. On January 5, 2017, IFC renewed Portlandia for a 10-episode final season, ahead of the season 7 premiere. In addition to introducing new guests stars, Natasha Lyonne, Jeff Goldblum, Kumail Nanjiani and Kyle MacLachlan were announced to return as guests for the final season. Armisen admitted that writing the season was "tricky" due to the change in administrations and said that the rise of Donald Trump "changed the way [Armisen] looks at some of the characters." Production concluded on September 9, 2017.

== Episodes ==
No. overall	No. in season	Title	Directed by	Written by	Original release date	US viewers (millions)
68	1	"Riot Spray"	Carrie Brownstein	Fred Armisen, Carrie Brownstein, Jonathan Krisel, Karey Dornetto, Megan Neuringer, Phoebe Robinson, Graham Wagner	January 18, 2018	0.152
Brendan and Michelle consider buying a van. Spyke gets his old band back together. Podcasters investigate a police station. Candace brings Toni to her childhood summer home.
69	2	"Shared Workspace"	Graham Wagner	Fred Armisen, Carrie Brownstein, Jonathan Krisel, Karey Dornetto, Megan Neuringer, Phoebe Robinson, Graham Wagner	January 25, 2018	0.104
Toni and Candace get involved in healthcare. Kathleen becomes the first female partner at her firm. Peter and Nance deal with a sushi situation. a single guy interrupts a couples' dinner.
70	3	"No Thank You"	Carrie Brownstein	Fred Armisen, Carrie Brownstein, Jonathan Krisel, Karey Dornetto, Megan Neuringer, Phoebe Robinson, Graham Wagner	February 1, 2018	0.100
Fred and Carrie help Rachel navigate dating apps. Kathleen and Dave take on an escape room. Andy and Drew swear off women. Joey tries therapy. Doug gives his friends benefit fatigue.
71	4	"Abracadabra"	Lance Bangs	Fred Armisen, Carrie Brownstein, Jonathan Krisel, Karey Dornetto, Megan Neuringer, Phoebe Robinson, Graham Wagner	February 8, 2018	0.130
A couple uses distraction cancelling glasses. Nina and Lance tell how they met. Peter and Nance look forward to breakfast. Malcolm and Kris get involved at a community meeting.
72	5	"Open Relationship"	Bill Benz	Fred Armisen, Carrie Brownstein, Jonathan Krisel, Karey Dornetto, Megan Neuringer, Phoebe Robinson, Graham Wagner	February 15, 2018	0.124
Doug and Claire try an open relationship. Shannon gets help parallel parking. A company uses VR for a meeting. The Mayor waits for a helicopter. Fred steps on a snail.
73	6	"You Do You"	Bill Benz & Ali Greer	Fred Armisen, Carrie Brownstein, Jonathan Krisel, Karey Dornetto, Megan Neuringer, Phoebe Robinson, Graham Wagner	February 22, 2018	0.100
Sandra discovers she can have it all. Fred and Carrie prepare for a natural disaster. Jamie's co-workers help her get over a cold. Kathleen and Dave learn how to take photo booth pictures.
74	7	"Most Pro City"	Bill Benz	Fred Armisen, Carrie Brownstein, Jonathan Krisel, Karey Dornetto, Megan Neuringer, Phoebe Robinson, Graham Wagner	March 1, 2018	0.100
Text message drama unfolds during a business meeting. The Mayor sets out to prove Portland's diversity. Activists on a hunger strike take a cheat day. Drivers communicate via hand signals.
75	8	"Peter Follows P!nk"	Bill Benz	Fred Armisen, Carrie Brownstein, Jonathan Krisel, Karey Dornetto, Megan Neuringer, Phoebe Robinson, Graham Wagner	March 8, 2018	0.108
Peter and Nance interact with celebrities on social media. Fred gives Carrie a rock n' roll remodel. James rides his bike to work. Gil and George say hello to Toni and Candace.
76	9	"Long Way Back"	Lance Bangs	Fred Armisen, Carrie Brownstein, Jonathan Krisel, Karey Dornetto, Megan Neuringer, Phoebe Robinson, Graham Wagner	March 15, 2018	0.084
Fred and Carrie just give up. The Weirdos lose their favorite trash can, which takes a multi-year journey throughout the city. Malcolm and Kris visit their pediatrician. Peter and Nance wonder why they’ve never been hacked.
77	10	"Rose Route"	Bill Benz	Fred Armisen, Carrie Brownstein, Jonathan Krisel, Karey Dornetto, Megan Neuringer, Phoebe Robinson, Graham Wagner	March 22, 2018	0.136
The mayor cuts deals all over town to secure the perfect route for the Portland Marathon. Candace's house guest Dolly quickly becomes her new best friend. Fred and Carrie decide to run to break their addiction to news alerts.

== Reception ==
The eighth and final season received generally favorable reviews. On the review aggregator website Rotten Tomatoes, the season holds a score of 83%, based on 6 reviews. In his review for The A.V. Club, John Hugar praised the series finale for ending "on a high note, with a delightfully ridiculous episode that features the show’s off-beat humor at its finest." Melanie McFarland, writing for Salon, said that the finale "remains true to the core of the series and its devotion to the timelessness of its weirdness."

== Ratings ==
Viewership and ratings per episode of Portlandia season 8
No.	Title	Air date	Rating/share (18–49)	Viewers (millions)
1	"Riot Spray"	January 18, 2018	0.05	0.152
2	"Shared Workspace"	January 25, 2018	0.03	0.104
3	"No Thank You"	February 1, 2018	0.02	0.100
4	"Abracadabra"	February 8, 2018	0.05	0.130
5	"Open Relationship"	February 15, 2018	0.03	0.124
6	"You Do You"	February 22, 2018	0.04	0.100
7	"Most Pro City"	March 1, 2018	0.03	0.100
8	"Peter Follows P!nk"	March 8, 2018	0.03	0.108
9	"Long Way Back"	March 15, 2018	0.03	0.084
10	"Rose Route"	March 22, 2018	0.03	0.136
