= Portlandia season 4 =

Portlandia
- Season 4
- DVD cover
- Starring: Fred Armisen; Carrie Brownstein
- No. of episodes: 10

Release
- Original network: IFC
- Original release: February 27 – May 1, 2014

Season chronology
- ← Previous; Season 3 Next → Season 5

The fourth season of Portlandia premiered on IFC in the United States on February 27 and concluded on May 1, 2014 with a total of 10 episodes.

== Cast ==
=== Main cast ===
- Fred Armisen
- Carrie Brownstein

=== Special guest cast ===
- Kyle MacLachlan as Mr. Mayor

=== Guest stars ===
- Vanessa Bayer as Bank Clerk and Wife
- Kirsten Dunst as Kim
- Kumail Nanjiani as Date Fact Checker, Human Bandwidth Manager, Car Dealer
- Tunde Adebimpe as himself
- Jay Pharoah as the voice of Jay-Z
- Olivia Wilde as Brit
- Steve Buscemi as Marty
- Jeff Goldblum as Beet Accident Man, The Pull-Out King, Dinner Guest
- Silas Weir Mitchell as FBI
- Jello Biafra as himself
- Annie Clark as herself
- Duff McKagan as himself
- Mark Proksch as Sean
- Kim Gordon as herself
- Maya Rudolph
- Jeff Tweedy as himself
- Tuck & Patti as themselves
- Lamarcus Aldridge as himself
- Damian Lillard as himself
- Robin Lopez as himself
- CJ McCollum as himself
- Thomas Robinson as himself
- Paul Allen as himself
- Gus Van Sant as himself
- The Blazer Dancers as themselves
- Neil Olshey as himself
- Josh Homme as Carrie's Brother
- Dan Savage as himself
- Nick Swardson
- Ed Begley Jr. as Minister
- Michael Nesmith as Mr. Mayor's father.
- k.d. lang as herself
- Jason Sudeikis as Kim
- Danny Bruno
- Graham Wagner

== Episodes ==
No. overall	No. in season	Title	Directed by	Written by	Original release date	US viewers (millions)
28	1	"Sharing Finances"	Jonathan Krisel	Fred Armisen, Carrie Brownstein, Jonathan Krisel, Karey Dornetto, Graham Wagner	February 27, 2014	0.314
Ghosts offering conflicting advice haunt a young woman; Doug and Claire decide to make a commitment; Kath and Dave cram a lot into a 15-minute period; Sandra discovers a soul mate; and the Date Fact Checker checks up on Fred.
29	2	"Ecoterrorists"	Jonathan Krisel	Fred Armisen, Carrie Brownstein, Jonathan Krisel, Karey Dornetto, Graham Wagner	March 6, 2014	0.152
30	3	"Celery"	Jonathan Krisel	Fred Armisen, Carrie Brownstein, Jonathan Krisel, Karey Dornetto, Graham Wagner	March 13, 2014	0.189
31	4	"Pull-Out King"	Jonathan Krisel	Fred Armisen, Carrie Brownstein, Jonathan Krisel, Karey Dornetto, Graham Wagner	March 20, 2014	0.135
32	5	"Spyke Drives"	Jonathan Krisel	Fred Armisen, Carrie Brownstein, Jonathan Krisel, Karey Dornetto, Graham Wagner	March 27, 2014	0.158
33	6	"Bahama Knights"	Jonathan Krisel	Fred Armisen, Carrie Brownstein, Jonathan Krisel, Karey Dornetto, Graham Wagner	April 3, 2014	0.216
34	7	"Trail Blazers"	Jonathan Krisel	Fred Armisen, Carrie Brownstein, Jonathan Krisel, Karey Dornetto, Graham Wagner	April 10, 2014	0.231
35	8	"Late in Life Drug Use"	Jonathan Krisel	Fred Armisen, Carrie Brownstein, Jonathan Krisel, Karey Dornetto, Graham Wagner	April 17, 2014	0.105
36	9	"3D Printer"	Jonathan Krisel	Fred Armisen, Carrie Brownstein, Jonathan Krisel, Karey Dornetto, Graham Wagner	April 24, 2014	0.206
37	10	"Getting Away"	Jonathan Krisel	Fred Armisen, Carrie Brownstein, Jonathan Krisel, Karey Dornetto, Graham Wagner	May 1, 2014	0.156
