= Portlandia season 7 =

Portlandia
- Season 7
- DVD cover
- No. of episodes: 10

Release
- Original network: IFC
- Original release: January 5 – March 9, 2017

Season chronology
- ← Previous; Season 6 Next → Season 8

The seventh season of the television comedy Portlandia premiered on IFC in the United States on January 5 and concluded on March 9, 2017 with a total of 10 episodes. The series stars Fred Armisen and Carrie Brownstein.

== Cast ==
=== Main cast ===
- Fred Armisen
- Carrie Brownstein

=== Special guest cast ===
- Kyle MacLachlan as Mr. Mayor

=== Guest stars ===
- Maria Bamford
- Natasha Lyonne
- Vanessa Bayer as Pregger
- Steve Buscemi
- Run the Jewels as Themselves
- Abbi Jacobson
- Linda Ramone
- Kate Pierson as herself
- Fred Schneider as himself
- Cindy Wilson as herself
- Tim Heidecker
- Laurie Metcalf
- Judy Greer as Shonna
- Kumail Nanjiani as The President
- Rachel Dratch
- Sam Richardson
- Damian Lillard
- Cameron Russell as herself
- Mitchell Hurwitz
- Andy Richter
- Ryan Hansen
- Jeff Tweedy
- Claire Danes as Acting instructor

== Production ==
IFC renewed Portlandia for a sixth and seventh season on February 10, 2015. The series was originally renewed until 2017 with this season intended to be the last, but Armisen and Brownstein hinted about the possibility of doing Season 8. Season 8 would eventually be announced as the last in January 2017.

== Episodes ==
No. overall	No. in season	Title	Directed by	Written by	Original release date	US viewers (millions)
58	1	"The Storytellers"	Carrie Brownstein	Fred Armisen, Carrie Brownstein, Jonathan Krisel, Karen Kilgariff, Graham Wagner	January 5, 2017	0.161
Fred and Carrie consult with a storytelling expert. A traveler checks into an unconventional hotel. The weirdos discover a store that specializes in bedding and home beauty products.
59	2	"Carrie Dates a Hunk"	Jonathan Krisel	Fred Armisen, Carrie Brownstein, Jonathan Krisel, Karen Kilgariff, Graham Wagner	January 12, 2017	0.134
Fred doesn't dig Carrie's beau. Drew and Andy ask about men. Melanie and Lars buy a rug.
60	3	"Fred's Cell Phone Company"	Carrie Brownstein	Fred Armisen, Carrie Brownstein, Jonathan Krisel, Karen Kilgariff, Graham Wagner	January 19, 2017	0.121
Fred starts a business. Kate and Sam learn the perils of long distance love. Drew and Andy plan a funeral. Nina gives Lance a massage chair.
61	4	"Separation Anxiety"	Bill Benz	Fred Armisen, Carrie Brownstein, Jonathan Krisel, Karen Kilgariff, Graham Wagner	January 26, 2017	0.126
Toni and Candace retire. Drew and Andy re-imagine gingerbread cookies. Rats consider the charms of squirrels.
62	5	"Amore"	Bill Benz	Fred Armisen, Carrie Brownstein, Jonathan Krisel, Karen Kilgariff, Graham Wagner	February 2, 2017	0.175
Fred has a marriage arranged. A school hires a bully to teach children grit. A man keeps commenting "Beautiful" on social media posts.
63	6	"Friend Replacement"	Jonathan Krisel	Fred Armisen, Carrie Brownstein, Jonathan Krisel, Karen Kilgariff, Graham Wagner	February 9, 2017	0.122
Carrie looks for a new friend. Jill tries a radical diet. Drew and Andy host a film festival. Ghavin opens an elaborate box set.
64	7	"Portland Secedes"	Bill Benz	Fred Armisen, Carrie Brownstein, Jonathan Krisel, Karen Kilgariff, Graham Wagner	February 16, 2017	0.145
Fred and Carrie help Portland secede. The eco-terrorists receive an award for Best Protest. Dave and Kath leave notes on cars.
65	8	"Ants"	Alice Mathias	Fred Armisen, Carrie Brownstein, Jonathan Krisel, Karen Kilgariff, Graham Wagner	February 23, 2017	0.115
Nina and Lance deal with an ant infestation. The mayor tries to break a world record. Time Tailors evaluate a man's schedule.
66	9	"Passenger Rating"	Steve Buscemi	Fred Armisen, Carrie Brownstein, Jonathan Krisel, Karen Kilgariff, Graham Wagner	March 2, 2017	0.109
Carrie tries to drive up her passenger rating on a ride-sharing app. An actor shows a boss how to terminate employees. The National Small Talk Convention is held. Sandra gets tight with a customer-service rep.
67	10	"Misunderstood Miracles"	Fred Armisen	Fred Armisen, Carrie Brownstein, Jonathan Krisel, Karen Kilgariff, Graham Wagner	March 9, 2017	0.126
Sandra teaches a pit bull self-control. Fred and Carrie attempt protesting for cyclist rights. Fred discovers models. Lisa and Bryce sell instant garbage. A couple explains alcohol to their adult son.
