= Felida, Washington =

- Census-designated place
- Location of Felida, Washington
- Coordinates: 45°42′50″N 122°42′37″W
- Country: United States
- State: Washington
- County: Clark

Area
  - Total: 3.0 sq mi (7.8 km^{2})
  - Land: 2.9 sq mi (7.5 km^{2})
  - Water: 0.15 sq mi (0.4 km^{2})
- Elevation: 210 ft (64 m)

Population (2020)
  - Total: 9,526
  - Density: 2,560/sq mi (988.6/km^{2})
- Time zone: UTC-8 (Pacific (PST))
  - Summer (DST): UTC-7 (PDT)
- ZIP Code: 98685
- Area code(s): 360, 564
- FIPS code: 53-23550
- GNIS feature ID: 2408206

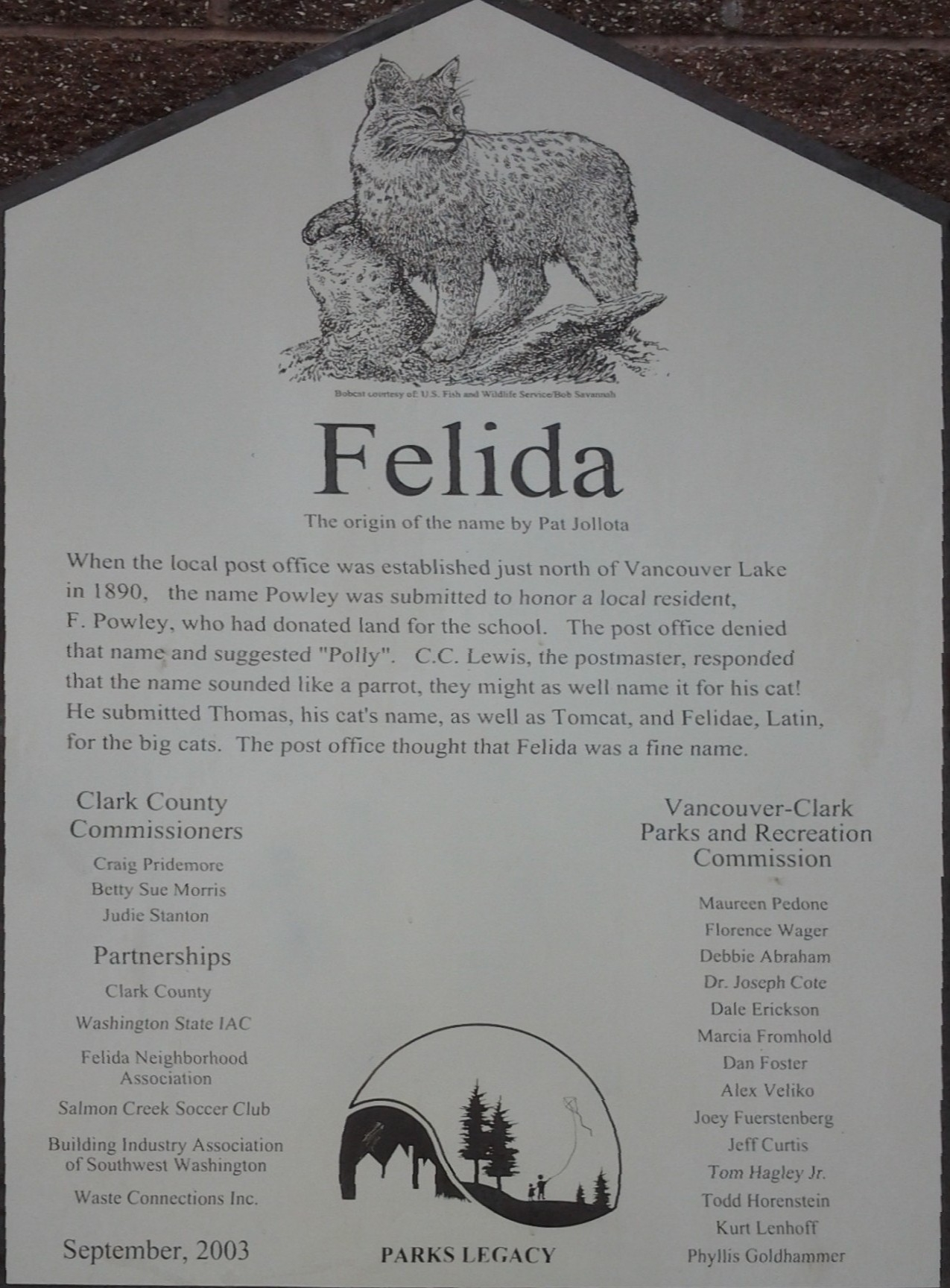
Origin of the name Felida

Felida is a census-designated place (CDP) in Clark County, Washington, United States. The population was 9,526 at the 2020 census.

A post office called Felida was established in 1890, and remained in operation until 1906. The community derives its name from Felidae, the family of cats.

== History ==
The area has important ties to the Lewis and Clark Expedition of 1804–1806, being close to the Chinookan town of Cathlapotle, then a settlement of 700–800 people, with at least 14 substantial plank houses. The community's ties to the Chinookan people was commemorated by the construction of a replica of a Cathlapotle plank house at the nearby Ridgefield National Wildlife Refuge, which was dedicated March 29, 2005.

A post office was established for the area northeast of Vancouver Lake, in 1890. While deciding what to name the post office, the first postmaster, Marian E. McIrvin, wanted it to be named Lakeview, but postal authorities informed him that there was already a place in Washington state named Lakeview. McIrvin's father-in-law suggested Felida for the name, and the name stuck.

A competing theory is that the town's name came from a suggestion for the post office to be referred to as Powley, after a local resident. The post office didn't want that name, and suggested it should be named Polly instead. C.C. Lewis, the current postmaster, thought that Polly was a name for a parrot, and that it should actually be named for his cat, Thomas. He submitted the names, Thomas, Tomcat, and Felidae. The post office thought that Felida would be a nice name, and took it.

== Geography ==
Felida is located in southwestern Clark County. The community is 7 miles (11 km) north of downtown Vancouver and is bordered by the communities of Salmon Creek (to the east) and Lake Shore (to the south).

According to the United States Census Bureau, the Felida CDP has a total area of 3.0 square miles (7.8 km^{2}), of which 2.9 square miles (7.5 km^{2}) is land and 0.2 square miles (0.4 km^{2}), or 4.74%, is water.

== Demographics ==
Historical population
Census	Pop.	Note	%±
1990	3,109		—
2000	5,683		82.8%
2010	7,385		29.9%
2020	9,526		29.0%

Felida first appeared as a census designated place in the 1990 U.S. census.

=== Racial and ethnic composition ===
Felida CDP, Washington – Racial and ethnic composition Note: the US Census treats Hispanic/Latino as an ethnic category. This table excludes Latinos from the racial categories and assigns them to a separate category. Hispanics/Latinos may be of any race.
Race / Ethnicity (NH = Non-Hispanic)	Pop 1990	Pop 2000	Pop 2010	Pop 2020	% 1990	% 2000	% 2010	% 2020
White alone (NH)	2,974	5,133	6,428	7,709	95.66%	90.32%	87.04%	80.93%
Black or African American alone (NH)	22	70	84	91	0.71%	1.23%	1.14%	0.96%
Native American or Alaska Native alone (NH)	9	31	45	46	0.29%	0.55%	0.61%	0.48%
Asian alone (NH)	48	168	284	443	1.54%	2.96%	3.85%	4.65%
Native Hawaiian or Pacific Islander alone (NH)	x	2	20	20	x	0.04%	0.27%	0.21%
Other race alone (NH)	0	4	10	59	0.00%	0.07%	0.14%	0.62%
Mixed race or Multiracial (NH)	x	128	230	619	x	2.25%	3.11%	6.50%
Hispanic or Latino (any race)	56	147	284	539	1.80%	2.59%	3.85%	5.66%
Total	3,109	5,683	7,385	9,526	100.00%	100.00%	100.00%	100.00%

=== 2000 census ===
As of the census of 2000, there were 5,683 people, 1,877 households, and 1,640 families residing in the CDP. The population density was 1,967.8 people per square mile (759.2/km^{2}). There were 1,959 housing units at an average density of 678.3/sq mi (261.7/km^{2}). The racial makeup of the CDP was 92.13% White, 1.23% African American, 0.58% Native American, 2.96% Asian, 0.04% Pacific Islander, 0.70% from other races, and 2.36% from two or more races. Hispanic or Latino of any race were 2.59% of the population. 21.4% were of German, 13.4% English, 10.3% Irish, 7.7% American and 5.2% Norwegian ancestry according to Census 2000.

There were 1,877 households, out of which 46.7% had children under the age of 18 living with them, 79.3% were married couples living together, 6.1% had a female householder with no husband present, and 12.6% were non-families. 9.1% of all households were made up of individuals, and 3.2% had someone living alone who was 65 years of age or older. The average household size was 3.03 and the average family size was 3.22.

In the CDP, the age distribution of the population shows 31.3% under the age of 18, 4.9% from 18 to 24, 29.0% from 25 to 44, 27.6% from 45 to 64, and 7.1% who were 65 years of age or older. The median age was 38 years. For every 100 females, there were 99.1 males. For every 100 females age 18 and over, there were 95.6 males.

The median income for a household in the CDP was $78,934, and the median income for a family was $80,264. Males had a median income of $59,125 versus $35,943 for females. The per capita income for the CDP was $28,294. About 2.9% of families and 3.4% of the population were below the poverty line, including 5.5% of those under age 18 and none of those age 65 or over.

=== 2020 census ===
As of the census of 2020, there were 9,526 people, and 3,802 households in the CDP. The population density was 3,276.9 inhabitants per square mile, compared to 2,560.6 in 2010. The racial makeup was 88.3% White, 0.6% African American, 0.1% Native American, 4.3% Asian, 0.0% Pacific Islander, and 6.7% from two or more races. Those of Hispanic or Latino origin made up 4.9% of the population.

16.9% of the population were 65 years or older, with 11.0% from 65 to 74, 5.2% from 75 to 84, and 0.7% older than 85. 26.1% were under 18, and 5.2% were under 5. The gender makeup was 48.6% female and 51.4% male.

== Education ==
It is within Vancouver Public Schools. Felida Elementary School is operated by the district.
