= Washington State University Vancouver =

Public university in Vancouver, Washington, U.S.

Coordinates: 45°43′52″N 122°38′13″W

- WSU Vancouver in April 2016
- Type: Public
- Established: 1989
- Chancellor: Sandra Haynes (interim)
- President: Elizabeth R. Cantwell
- Academic staff: 180
- Students: 3,504
- Location: Vancouver, Washington, U.S.
- Campus: Suburb 351 acres (1.42 km^{2})
- Colors: Crimson and Gray
- Nicknames: WSUV, VanCougs, Cougs, Cougars
- Mascot: Butch T. Cougar
- Website: vancouver.wsu.edu

Washington State University Vancouver (WSU Vancouver) is a regional campus of Washington State University. WSU Vancouver is located on a 351-acre (1.42 km^{2}) campus outside of Vancouver, Washington, United States, approximately eight miles (13 km) north of the Columbia River and 17 miles (27 km) north of downtown Portland, Oregon. Degrees offered by WSU Vancouver are conferred by Washington State University. Previously an undergraduate transfer college, WSU Vancouver expanded to a full four-year university in 2006.

It is in the Mount Vista census-designated place.

== History ==
Washington State University began offering courses in Southwest Washington in 1983 as part of the Southwest Washington Joint Center for Education. In 1989, the university in Pullman formally established Washington State University Vancouver as a branch campus of the state's land-grant institution.

In 1990, the Washington State Higher Education Coordinating Board approved placing the campus at Salmon Creek, a community north of Vancouver. The site was chosen over two other finalists, a campus adjacent to Clark College and a site in Mill Plain.

The current campus opened in 1996. In Fall 2006, WSU Vancouver admitted freshmen and sophomores for the first time and began offering lower-division courses.

== Campus resources ==
The 351-acre (1.42 km^{2}) campus has many computing and research laboratories, including student computing labs, fabrication labs, science research labs, group instruction labs, fine arts labs, a circuits and microprocessors lab, computer-aided drafting lab and a writing center. The science resources and instrumentation possessed by the campus consist of GC/MS, HPLC (UVvis), DNA sequencer, TOC/N, RT-PCR, Flame ionization detector, two Phantom cameras, a scanning electron microscope, an Instron tensile tester, and a confocal microscope, along with a fully functional cleanroom.

WSU Vancouver's library has more than 800 journals in hardcopy and over 9,000 full-text online journals and newspapers, a core collection of more than 30,000 books and access to more than 100 major bibliographic databases. The library participates in several local and regional library consortia, including the Portland Area Library System and ORBIS/CASCADE (the Oregon and Washington Cooperative Library Project). It also houses the Environmental Information Cooperative Library.

== Academic programs ==
WSU Vancouver offers bachelor's degrees, master's degrees, and doctorate degrees in more than 40 fields of study. Students may also be enrolled in science graduate study programs in the School of Biological Sciences in Pullman and pursue their entire degree at WSU Vancouver; greatly enhancing the number of degrees available at the master's and doctoral level by proxy.

== Research labs ==
The School of Engineering and Computer Science at WSU Vancouver operates several research laboratories, including the Nanomaterials-Sensor Laboratory, Wireless Circuit and System Research Lab, Computer Aided Engineering Lab, Electric Power Systems Lab, Robotics and Automation Lab, Radio Frequency (RF) Research Laboratory, Advanced Materials and Manufacturing Lab, Micro-Nano-Bio Systems Lab, Electrochemical Engineering Lab, Fluid Dynamics Lab, Interfacial Fluid Dynamics Lab, Parallel and Distributed Data Management Systems Lab, Distributed Systems Research Lab. Usually faculties receive funding from government agencies, and local companies. There are also many research labs in the School of Environmental Science, Biology, Mathematics, and Neuroscience. These include the aquatic ecology lab, conservation biology lab, and the ecology of Mount St. Helens, among others.

== Students ==
The opening of the Firstenburg Student Commons (FSC) in the Fall of 2007 marked a change in student life on the Vancouver campus.

Although there is currently no on-campus housing, WSU Vancouver offers many activities and events for students. For example, there are many student-run organizations such as a History Club, Cougar Pride LGBT club and KOUG radio. KOUG Radio is a student-run radio station that occasionally features radio shows broadcast by DJs, most of whom are students at the university. Another student-run organization is the Salmon Creek Journal, a visual arts and literary magazine created by students, alumni and faculty.

- Enrollment (Fall 2020): 3,504 students
- Average age(s) of student: 33–36
- Female: 55%
- Male: 45%
- 6% of students are veterans
- 45% first generation students
- 31% ethnic minority students
- 1:14 faculty:student ratio

== Alumni ==
A total of 17,228 graduates have completed study at WSU Vancouver. Roughly 92 percent of alumni remain in the area. As the campus is located close to many industrial and tech corporations, most of the WSU Vancouver alumni works in nearby companies located in Washington, Oregon, and California.

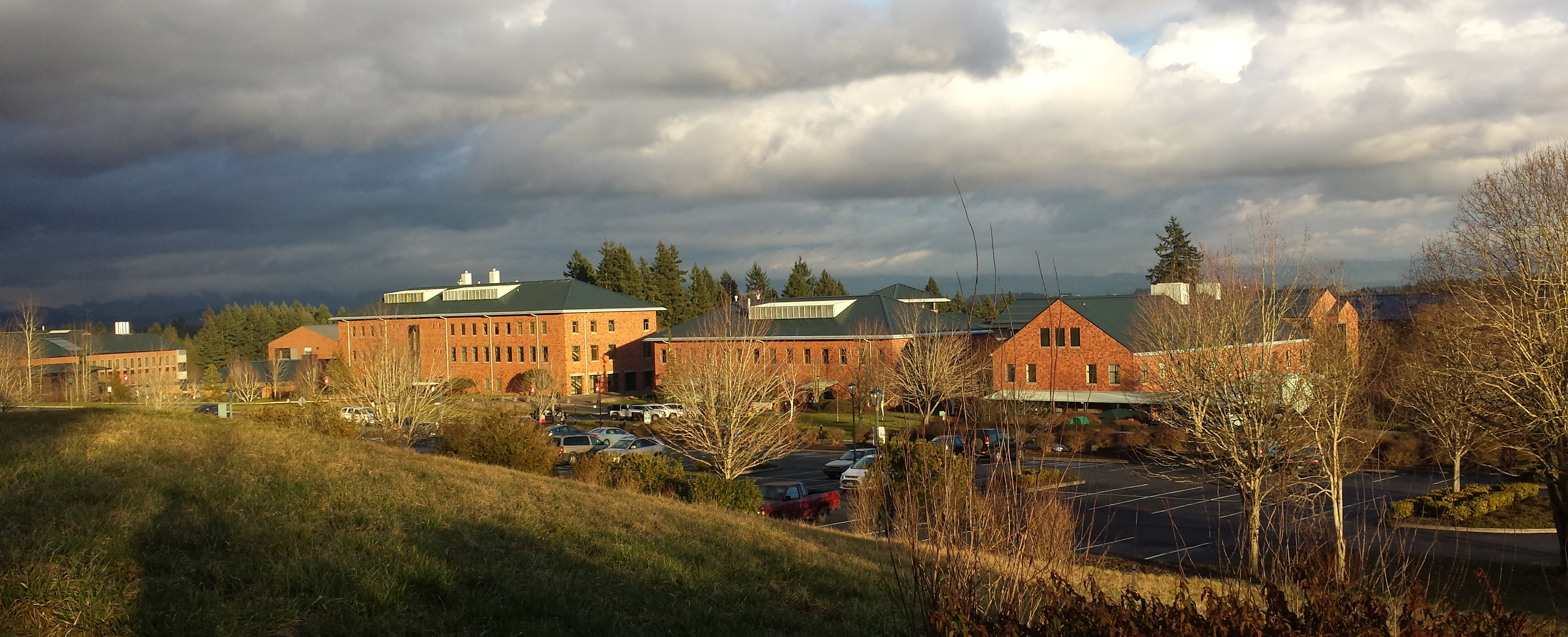
WSU Vancouver in January 2014.

== Popular culture ==
In the novel Fifty Shades of Grey, the main character, Anastasia Steele, attends and graduates from WSU Vancouver. In response to this association, Avantika Bawa, a professor of Fine Arts at WSU Vancouver curated a 2013 show of student work titled 'Better Shades of Grey'.

== See also ==
- Firstenburg Family Fountain
