= John Zupan =

American grocery store owner

John Zupan (c. 1945–August 29, 2011) was the founder of an American independent grocery store chain called Zupan's Markets in Oregon. Established in 1975, the store continues to operate in the Portland metro area 50 years later, operated by his son, Mike Zupan.

== Career ==
He started working in the produce business at age 16, as a produce clerk at Sheridan Fruit Company, Inc., in Southeast Portland, followed by Corno's Food Market. For 11 years, he worked at Fred Meyer, eventually serving as produce district manager, and worked personally with eponymous grocer Fred G. Meyer, a major influence.

At age 30, Zupan and his coworker Chuck Gaylord bought Zim's grocery store near Gresham, Oregon. After selling his share of the business, Zupan went on to operate ThriftWay and Food Pavilion stores, before finally opening his first Zupan's Market on W Burnside in Portland. He opened his fourth Zupan's Market store in Raleigh Hills in 1996. At the time, Zupan's Markets was an Oregon corporation with administrative offices in Washington. Zupan was well known for his unique skill in presenting fresh produce to consumers.

Zupan handed his business over to his son Michael in 2000, although he remained involved in the business. Even after his son took the helm, the stores were designed not to distract from fresh food. At the time of his death in 2011, the store was known as an upscale gourmet grocery store chain.

== Personal life and legacy ==
Zupan's hobby was vintage cars and motorcycles. For many years, Zupan's Markets sponsored an annual vintage car race at Portland International Raceway. He was also part owner of an indoor soccer team.

In 2011, John Zupan died aged 66 in a hit-and-run motorcycle accident. When he died, Ron McKnight, former president of the Northwest Grocers Association, called him "a grocery store maverick, an innovator, a visionary".
