= Portlandia season 5 =

Portlandia
- Season 5
- DVD cover
- No. of episodes: 10

Release
- Original network: IFC
- Original release: January 8 – March 12, 2015

Season chronology
- ← Previous; Season 4 Next → Season 6

The fifth season of the television comedy Portlandia began airing on IFC in the United States on January 8, 2015, consisting a total of 10 episodes. The series stars Fred Armisen and Carrie Brownstein.

== Cast ==
=== Main cast ===
- Fred Armisen
- Carrie Brownstein

=== Special guest cast ===
- Kyle MacLachlan as Mr. Mayor
- Paul Simon as himself

=== Guest stars ===
- Peter Giles as Bruce Nathansen
- Justin Long as Lance's mom's boyfriend
- Ed Begley, Jr.
- Brigette Nielsen
- Shepard Fairey as himself
- Jeff Goldblum as himself, Vocal coach
- Natasha Lyonne as Madison
- Olivia Wilde as Brit
- Jane Lynch as Barbecue planner
- Matt Groening as himself
- Kumail Nanjiani
- Parker Posey
- Caroll Spinney as Oscar the Grouch
- Greta Gerwig as Mermaid
- Graham Wagner
- Steve Buscemi as Milton
- Anna Gunn as Glynis Brooks
- Vanessa Bayer as Speaker system customer
- Seth Meyers as Chad Koop
- Paul Reubens as Weirdos' lawyer

== Episodes ==
No. overall	No. in season	Title	Directed by	Written by	Original release date	US viewers (millions)
38	1	"The Story of Toni and Candace"	Jonathan Krisel	Fred Armisen, Carrie Brownstein, Jonathan Krisel, Karey Dornetto, Graham Wagner	January 8, 2015	0.218
The origin of the feminist bookstore; Toni and Candace are in fierce competition.
39	2	"The Fiance"	Jonathan Krisel	Fred Armisen, Carrie Brownstein, Jonathan Krisel, Karey Dornetto, Graham Wagner	January 15, 2015	0.223
Lance and Nina feel pressure when Lance's mom and her new boyfriend visit.
40	3	"Healthcare"	Jonathan Krisel	Fred Armisen, Carrie Brownstein, Jonathan Krisel, Karey Dornetto, Graham Wagner	January 22, 2015	0.230
Medical solutions are sought when a series of health ailments occurs.
41	4	"SeaWorld"	Jonathan Krisel	Fred Armisen, Carrie Brownstein, Jonathan Krisel, Karey Dornetto, Graham Wagner	January 29, 2015	0.184
The Ecoterrorists travel to San Diego to take down their next target, SeaWorld.
42	5	"4th of July"	Jonathan Krisel	Fred Armisen, Carrie Brownstein, Jonathan Krisel, Karey Dornetto, Graham Wagner	February 5, 2015	0.159
Kath and Dave decide to host an unforgettable 4th of July barbecue; special fireworks.
43	6	"Fashion"	Jonathan Krisel	Fred Armisen, Carrie Brownstein, Jonathan Krisel, Karey Dornetto, Graham Wagner	February 12, 2015	0.140
Portland’s Dollar Store recruits Quinn as the face for their rebranding campaign. Spyke faces trial for making unlicensed Bart Simpson merchandise.
44	7	"Doug Becomes a Feminist"	Daniel Gray Longino	Fred Armisen, Carrie Brownstein, Jonathan Krisel, Karey Dornetto, Graham Wagner	February 19, 2015	0.194
Doug discovers that he is a male feminist. Sandra takes a rideshare for the first time.
45	8	"House for Sale"	Steve Buscemi	Fred Armisen, Carrie Brownstein, Jonathan Krisel, Karey Dornetto, Graham Wagner	February 26, 2015	0.169
Fred and Carrie’s landlord moves into their house. Kath and Dave look to buy a new home for their next renovation project.
46	9	"You Can Call Me Al"	Jonathan Krisel	Fred Armisen, Carrie Brownstein, Jonathan Krisel, Karey Dornetto, Graham Wagner	March 5, 2015	0.218
Kath and Dave scramble to rehearse for a karaoke party.
47	10	"Dead Pets"	Jonathan Krisel	Fred Armisen, Carrie Brownstein, Jonathan Krisel, Karey Dornetto, Graham Wagner	March 12, 2015	0.248
Police begin profiling weirdos after arsonists burn down a taxidermy shop.
