= Mount Vista, Washington =

- Census-designated place
- Location of Mount Vista, Washington
- Coordinates: 45°44′34″N 122°37′30″W
- Country: United States
- State: Washington
- County: Clark

Area
  - Total: 5.3 sq mi (13.6 km^{2})
  - Land: 5.3 sq mi (13.6 km^{2})
  - Water: 0 sq mi (0.0 km^{2})
- Elevation: 230 ft (70 m)

Population (2020)
  - Total: 10,051
  - Density: 1,910/sq mi (739/km^{2})
- Time zone: UTC-8 (Pacific (PST))
  - Summer (DST): UTC-7 (PDT)
- FIPS code: 53-47630
- GNIS feature ID: 2408879

Mount Vista is a census-designated place (CDP) in Clark County, Washington, United States. It includes the Vancouver campus of Washington State University. The population of Mount Vista was 10,051 at the 2020 census.

Based on per capita income, one of the more reliable measures of affluence, Mount Vista ranks 66th of 614 areas in the state of Washington to be ranked.

== Geography ==
Mount Vista is located in southwestern Clark County. The area is bordered to the west by Interstate 5, to the southwest by the community of Salmon Creek, and to the southeast by Barberton. It is 9 miles (14 km) north of downtown Vancouver.

According to the United States Census Bureau, the Mount Vista CDP has a total area of 5.3 square miles (13.6 km^{2}), all of it land.

== Demographics ==
Historical population
Census	Pop.	Note	%±
2000	5,770		—
2010	7,850		36.0%
2020	10,051		28.0%
U.S. Decennial Census; 1990 2000 2010

Mount Vista first appeared as a census designated place in the 2000 U.S. census.

=== Racial and ethnic composition ===
Mount Vista CDP, Washington – Racial and ethnic composition Note: the US Census treats Hispanic/Latino as an ethnic category. This table excludes Latinos from the racial categories and assigns them to a separate category. Hispanics/Latinos may be of any race.
Race / Ethnicity (NH = Non-Hispanic)	Pop 2000	Pop 2010	Pop 2020	% 2000	% 2010	% 2020
White alone (NH)	5,278	6,656	7,860	91.47%	84.79%	78.20%
Black or African American alone (NH)	52	143	176	0.90%	1.82%	1.75%
Native American or Alaska Native alone (NH)	21	62	51	0.36%	0.79%	0.51%
Asian alone (NH)	158	305	505	2.74%	3.89%	5.02%
Native Hawaiian or Pacific Islander alone (NH)	8	21	56	0.14%	0.27%	0.56%
Other race alone (NH)	6	18	58	0.10%	0.23%	0.58%
Mixed race or Multiracial (NH)	105	250	635	1.82%	3.18%	6.32%
Hispanic or Latino (any race)	142	395	710	2.46%	5.03%	7.06%
Total	5,770	7,850	10,051	100.00%	100.00%	100.00%

=== 2020 census ===
As of the 2020 census, Mount Vista had a population of 10,051. The median age was 42.5 years. 19.8% of residents were under the age of 18 and 21.9% of residents were 65 years of age or older. For every 100 females there were 90.2 males, and for every 100 females age 18 and over there were 89.8 males age 18 and over.

93.6% of residents lived in urban areas, while 6.4% lived in rural areas.

There were 3,987 households in Mount Vista, of which 27.1% had children under the age of 18 living in them. Of all households, 54.1% were married-couple households, 14.5% were households with a male householder and no spouse or partner present, and 24.9% were households with a female householder and no spouse or partner present. About 24.9% of all households were made up of individuals and 11.9% had someone living alone who was 65 years of age or older.

There were 4,317 housing units, of which 7.6% were vacant. The homeowner vacancy rate was 1.0% and the rental vacancy rate was 7.8%.

Racial composition as of the 2020 census
Race	Number	Percent
White	8,027	79.9%
Black or African American	183	1.8%
American Indian and Alaska Native	84	0.8%
Asian	508	5.1%
Native Hawaiian and Other Pacific Islander	56	0.6%
Some other race	238	2.4%
Two or more races	955	9.5%

=== 2000 census ===
As of the census of 2000, there were 5,770 people, 2,215 households, and 1,705 families residing in the CDP. The population density was 1,103.8 people per square mile (426.0/km^{2}). There were 2,347 housing units at an average density of 449.0/sq mi (173.3/km^{2}). The racial makeup of the CDP was 93.08% White, 0.99% African American, 0.43% Native American, 2.82% Asian, 0.14% Pacific Islander, 0.47% from other races, and 2.06% from two or more races. Hispanic or Latino of any race were 2.46% of the population. 21.9% were of German, 11.7% English, 9.4% American, 7.0% Norwegian and 5.5% Irish ancestry according to Census 2000.

There were 2,215 households, out of which 33.1% had children under the age of 18 living with them, 66.1% were married couples living together, 7.6% had a female householder with no husband present, and 23.0% were non-families. 17.4% of all households were made up of individuals, and 4.2% had someone living alone who was 65 years of age or older. The average household size was 2.60 and the average family size was 2.95.

In the CDP, the age distribution of the population shows 24.8% under the age of 18, 8.0% from 18 to 24, 26.9% from 25 to 44, 30.3% from 45 to 64, and 10.0% who were 65 years of age or older. The median age was 40 years. For every 100 females, there were 95.5 males. For every 100 females age 18 and over, there were 93.5 males.

The median income for a household in the CDP was $66,406, and the median income for a family was $68,539. Males had a median income of $48,264 versus $34,972 for females. The per capita income for the CDP was $29,594. About 2.8% of families and 3.4% of the population were below the poverty line, including 5.2% of those under age 18 and 4.8% of those age 65 or over.

== Education ==
Most of Mount Vista is in Battle Ground School District. A portion is located in Vancouver Public Schools, and another portion is located in Ridgefield School District.

In regards to the section in the Battle Ground district, it is zoned to Pleasant Valley School for K-8, and to Prairie High School.

Washington State University Vancouver is in Mount Vista.
