= Portlandia season 6 =

Portlandia
- Season 6
- DVD cover
- No. of episodes: 10

Release
- Original network: IFC
- Original release: January 21 – March 24, 2016

Season chronology
- ← Previous; Season 5 Next → Season 7

The sixth season of the television comedy Portlandia began airing on IFC in the United States on January 21, 2016, consisting a total of 10 episodes. The series stars Fred Armisen and Carrie Brownstein.

== Cast ==
=== Main cast ===
- Carrie Brownstein
- Fred Armisen

=== Special guest cast ===
- Kyle MacLachlan as Mr. Mayor

=== Guest stars ===
- Wayne Coyne as himself
- Steven Drozd as himself
- Ron Lynch as himself
- Natasha Lyonne as Laura's friend, Carrie's friend #2
- The Flaming Lips as themselves
- Mitchell Hurwitz as OB and GYN
- Kumail Nanjiani as Max Pcx employee
- Alia Shawkat as Mayor's kid
- Jillian Bell as Car rental clerk
- Glenn Danzig as Radu
- Moshe Kasher
- Zoë Kravitz as Kendall
- Bitsie Tulloch as Taxi customer
- Steve Buscemi as Landlord
- Louis C.K. as himself
- Kevin Corrigan
- Robert Smigel
- Kai Ryssdal

== Episodes ==
No. overall	No. in season	Title	Directed by	Written by	Original release date	US viewers (millions)
48	1	"Pickathon"	Bill Benz	Fred Armisen, Carrie Brownstein, Jonathan Krisel, Karey Dornetto, Graham Wagner	January 21, 2016	0.207
The Flaming Lips headline Portland's Pickathon Music Festival. Brendan and Michelle attend the festival via drone. Two concertgoers go boy-crazy.
49	2	"Going Gray"	Jonathan Krisel	Fred Armisen, Carrie Brownstein, Jonathan Krisel, Karey Dornetto, Graham Wagner	January 28, 2016	0.159
Fred wakes up with gray hair and sets out on a journey to figure out how old he is. The Mayor reminds Carrie about an arrangement they made five years ago. Carrie is faced with a huge life decision.
50	3	"Shville"	Jonathan Krisel	Fred Armisen, Carrie Brownstein, Jonathan Krisel, Karey Dornetto, Graham Wagner	February 4, 2016	0.152
Fred wants to do something big with his life so he moves to Austin. Carrie is surprised when a bunch of unexpected guests arrive at her house, and she finally experiences motherhood.
51	4	"Weirdo Beach"	Daniel Gray Longino	Fred Armisen, Carrie Brownstein, Jonathan Krisel, Karey Dornetto, Graham Wagner	February 11, 2016	0.163
The Weirdos decide to go to the beach but are stalled when their hearse breaks down. An office worker is annoyed that everyone is using his brand new charger.
52	5	"Breaking Up"	Jonathan Krisel	Fred Armisen, Carrie Brownstein, Jonathan Krisel, Karey Dornetto, Graham Wagner	February 18, 2016	0.165
Claire is finally fed up with Doug's childish behavior and breaks up with him. Doug dates a millennial, Kendall (Zoe Kravitz) and Claire dates Candace, which allows them to discover surprising things about themselves.
53	6	"TADA"	Daniel Gray Longino	Fred Armisen, Carrie Brownstein, Jonathan Krisel, Karey Dornetto, Graham Wagner	February 25, 2016	0.116
Kath & Dave feel marginalized after an accident leaves them temporarily disabled. A car service app user dodges surge pricing by calling a cab. Joey gets an internship.
54	7	"Family Emergency"	Steve Buscemi	Fred Armisen, Carrie Brownstein, Jonathan Krisel, Karey Dornetto, Graham Wagner	March 3, 2016	0.136
Louis C.K. cancels a show in Portland due to a family emergency. Fred and Carrie are asked to judge a plume contest at a new vape store.
55	8	"First Feminist City"	Steve Buscemi	Fred Armisen, Carrie Brownstein, Jonathan Krisel, Karey Dornetto, Graham Wagner	March 10, 2016	0.127
Portland is declared the most feminist city in the country, and Toni and Candace have to deal with the attention. The town opens a Femi-Mart.
56	9	"Lance is Smart"	Jonathan Krisel	Fred Armisen, Carrie Brownstein, Jonathan Krisel, Karey Dornetto, Graham Wagner	March 17, 2016	0.131
Lance gets glasses and joins an intellectual crowd. Nina hires a tutor to help her win over Lance's new friends.
57	10	"Noodle Monster"	Jonathan Krisel	Fred Armisen, Carrie Brownstein, Jonathan Krisel, Karey Dornetto, Graham Wagner	March 24, 2016	0.120
A tsukemen ramen monster is on the loose in Portland. The mayor tries to impress a major brand visiting Portland and enlists Fred and Carrie to help.
