= Portlandia season 1 =

Portlandia
- Season 1
- DVD cover
- Starring: Fred Armisen; Carrie Brownstein
- No. of episodes: 6

Release
- Original network: IFC
- Original release: January 21 – February 25, 2011

Season chronology
- Next → Season 2

The first season of the television comedy Portlandia premiered on IFC in the United States from January 21 to February 25, 2011, for six episodes.

== Cast ==
=== Main cast ===
- Fred Armisen as Fred, Peter, Candace, Jason
- Carrie Brownstein as Carrie, Nance, Toni, Melanie

=== Special guest cast ===
- Kyle MacLachlan as Mr. Mayor

=== Guest stars ===
- Steve Buscemi as Book Store Customer
- Jason Sudeikis as Aliki
- Aubrey Plaza as Book Store Customer and Beth
- Sam Adams as Mayor's Assistant
- Aimee Mann as herself
- Sarah McLachlan as herself
- Edie McClurg as Mayor's Secretary
- Kumail Nanjiani as Cell Phone Salesman
- Selma Blair as Frannie Walker
- Jenny Conlee, Colin Meloy, James Mercer and Corin Tucker as Echo Echo
- Gus Van Sant as himself
- Heather Graham as herself
- Nick Kroll as Daniel Prison
- Nick Kroll as Baseball Player (uncredited)

== Episodes ==
No. overall	No. in season	Title	Directed by	Written by	Original release date	US viewers (millions)
1	1	"Farm"	Jonathan Krisel	Fred Armisen, Carrie Brownstein, Jonathan Krisel, Allison Silverman	January 21, 2011	0.263
Peter and Nance go to great lengths to make sure that their restaurant order (from Aliki's farm, played by Jason Sudeikis) is ethical and humane. A customer (played by Steve Buscemi) experiences the restroom policy of the feminist bookstore (based on In Other Words bookstore.)
2	2	"A Song for Portland"	Jonathan Krisel	Fred Armisen, Carrie Brownstein, Jonathan Krisel, Allison Silverman	January 28, 2011	0.186
Fred and Carrie meet the mayor of Portland (Kyle MacLachlan), who gives them a special assignment. Toni and Candace "help" a student (Aubrey Plaza) at the feminist bookstore.
3	3	"Aimee"	Jonathan Krisel	Fred Armisen, Carrie Brownstein, Jonathan Krisel, Allison Silverman	February 4, 2011	0.178
Spike decides "It's over". Fred and Carrie's domestic cleaner is Aimee Mann while Sarah McLachlan tends their garden.
4	4	"Mayor Is Missing"	Jonathan Krisel	Fred Armisen, Carrie Brownstein, Jonathan Krisel, Allison Silverman	February 11, 2011	N/A
When the mayor goes missing, Fred and Carrie begin a frantic search for him.
5	5	"Blunderbuss"	Jonathan Krisel	Fred Armisen, Carrie Brownstein, Jonathan Krisel, Allison Silverman	February 18, 2011	N/A
All of Portlandia is swept up in the excitement of a new music and film festival.
6	6	"Baseball"	Jonathan Krisel	Fred Armisen, Carrie Brownstein, Jonathan Krisel, Allison Silverman	February 25, 2011	N/A
The mayor turns to Fred and Carrie to help him put together a big-league baseball team.
