= Plank house =

Indigenous architecture from the Pacific Northwest

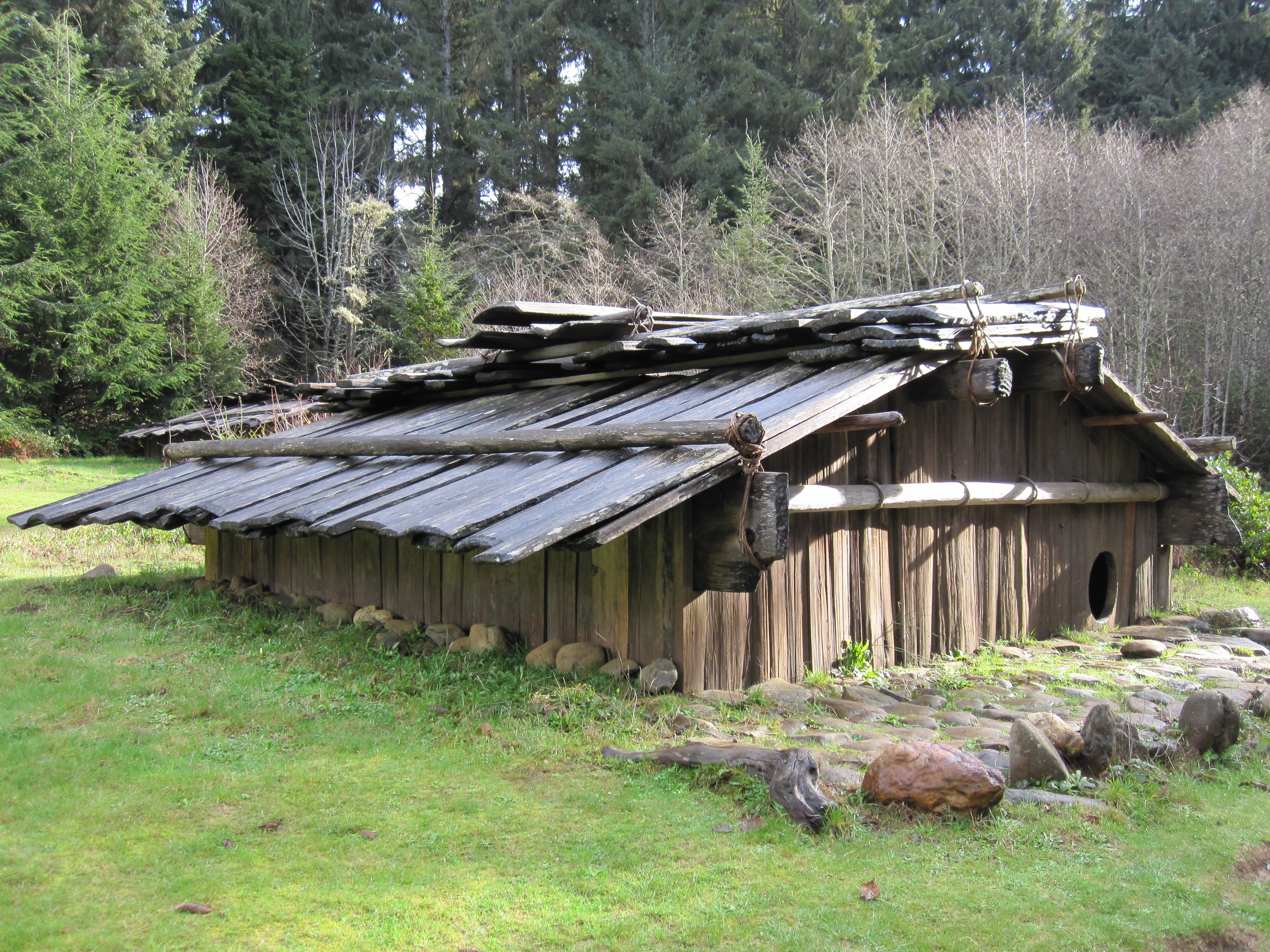
Traditional Yurok Indian family house at Sumêg Village, in Sue-meg State Park, northern California

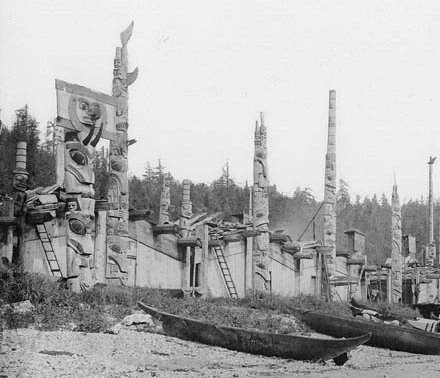
Haida houses in 1878 in the village of Skidegate, Skidegate Inlet, British Columbia, Canada

A plank house is a type of house constructed by Indigenous peoples of the Pacific Northwest, typically using cedar planks.

== History ==
The oldest plank house village found is located in Kitselas Canyon at the Paul Mason Site in western British Columbia, Canada. This village is estimated to be 3,000 years old. At the Maurer site in British Columbia the remains of a rectangular building have been excavated, providing artifacts which date the site to between 1920 and 2830 BCE.

== Material ==
Due to the nature of this building material, the anthropological documentation for these people is not widespread. The manner of wood harvest and continued use of that harvest was purposeful and sustainable. Native people of the Pacific Northwest maintained a distinct respect for red cedar and the value it had held for many generations.

Cedar logs compose the primary support system of the plank houses of the Pacific Northwest Indians and are clad with thick cedar planks harvested from living trees. Cedar trees have a straight grain with very few knots and have good weather resistance. The straight grain enables the separation of planks of wood from the tree. Craftspeople would insert a wedge to create a section of wood through the tree's height and remove it with an adze at both ends. This harvest method was sustainable and enabled the people to use the wood and to have a supply of planks to rebuild in another location. The people's patience is evident in the practice of leaving the wedge in place to continue the pressure that would enable another wedge placement further up, creating longer planks.

== Construction ==
Canadian anthropologist Wilson Duff quotes Simon Fraser, who (upon observation of the Coast Salish homes on the banks of the now-named Fraser River) wrote in his 1800 journal; "as an excellent house 46 × 32 and constructed like American frame houses; the planks are three to 4 inches thick, each plank overlapping the adjoining one a couple of inches; the post, which is very strong and crudely carved, received across beams; the walls are 11 feet high and covered with a slanting roof. On the opposite side of the river, there is a considerable village with houses similar to the one on the side." Kenneth Ames, a contributor to Life in the Big House; Household Labor and Dwelling Size on the Northwest Coast, calculates the volume of wood in this house to exceed five hundred thousand board feet (1,200 m^{3}). A multi-family house found in Nanaimo, on the eastern coast of Vancouver Island, Canada, is documented as being made of split cedar planks that were "held in place by withes (cedar rope) that come from the long lower branches of Cedar trees that grow in open spaces." (Fraser)

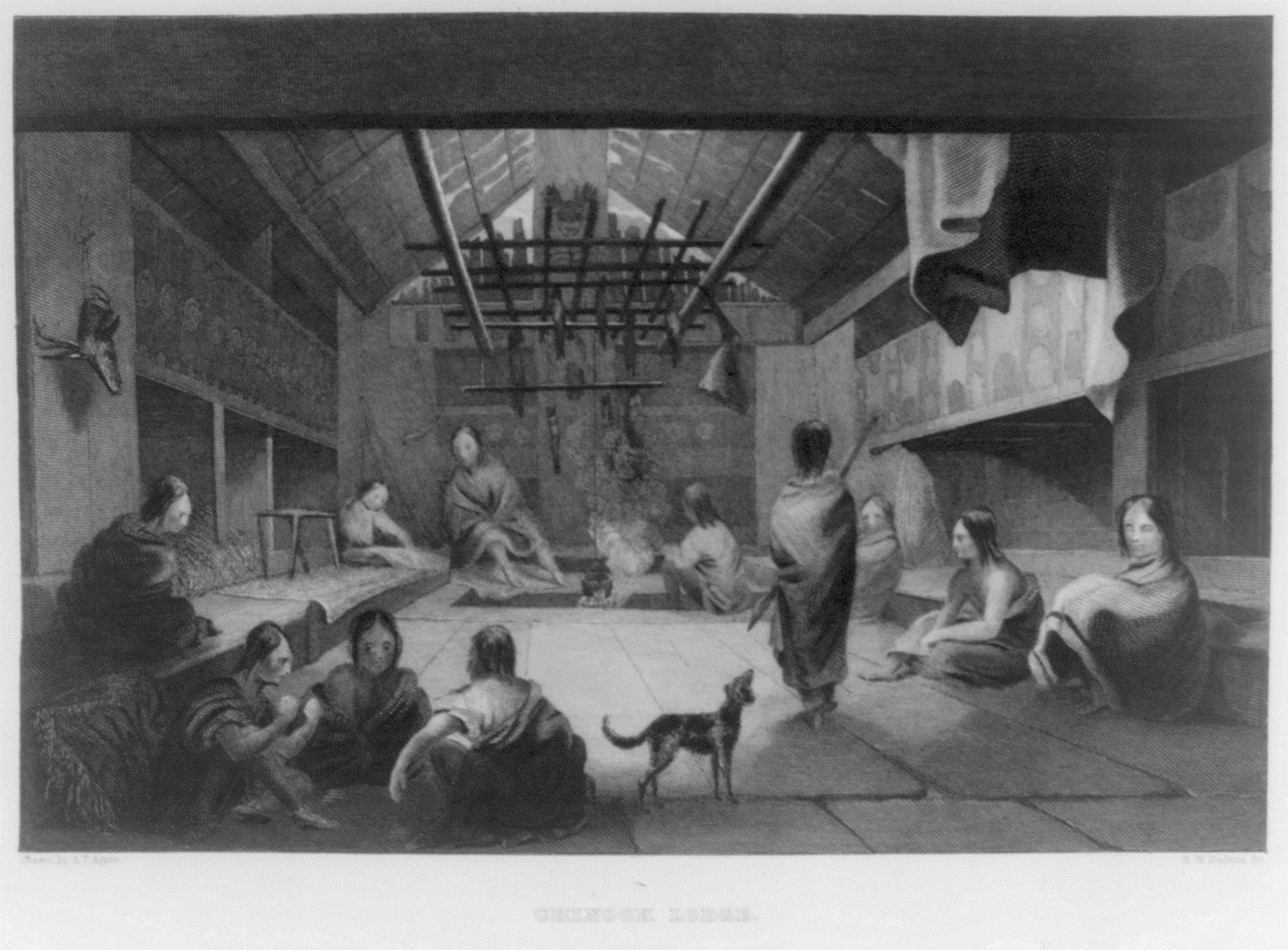
Interior of a Chinookan plank house, illustration by Wilkes in the 1850s. Many important details are seen here, including the use of a plank floor, a large, central hearth, sleeping and storage bunks, and the drying/smoking rack above the fire. There is also a dog and a musket propped in the rear left corner.

The cedar ropes that secured the planks to the uprights and beams allowed the people to deconstruct their homes and bring their planks with them to the next location. These planks were neither small nor easily obtained, but they were valuable assets and, as such, they were transported with household goods during the seasonal migrations. The house frames were left intact until the next season when the people returned and reattached their traveling planks and reconstructed their homes.

There were two distinct roof types found in this region. Both types are placed on a rectangular house that has a hearth or fire pit. One type consists of gabled, paired ridgepoles, vertical walls, and roof planks with an interior pit that was reached via steps. James Cook described the shed roof structures on Vancouver Island and around Puget Sound. His description is that of a cruder type of building that may have been in the adaptive stages of the house type possibly brought to the coast by the Salish people, who modified it as needed with the location change. These shed-roof houses are the largest constructed anywhere in this region.

The articles that have been written by anthropologists describe the shed roofs as being shed types that are not consistent in the description of the roof pitch. One informant will state that the roof was slanted to the back of the house, and another will say it was pitched to the front or the side of the house. The roof pitch was adjusted according to the direction from which the rain came down. Regionally, the rain comes from the south.

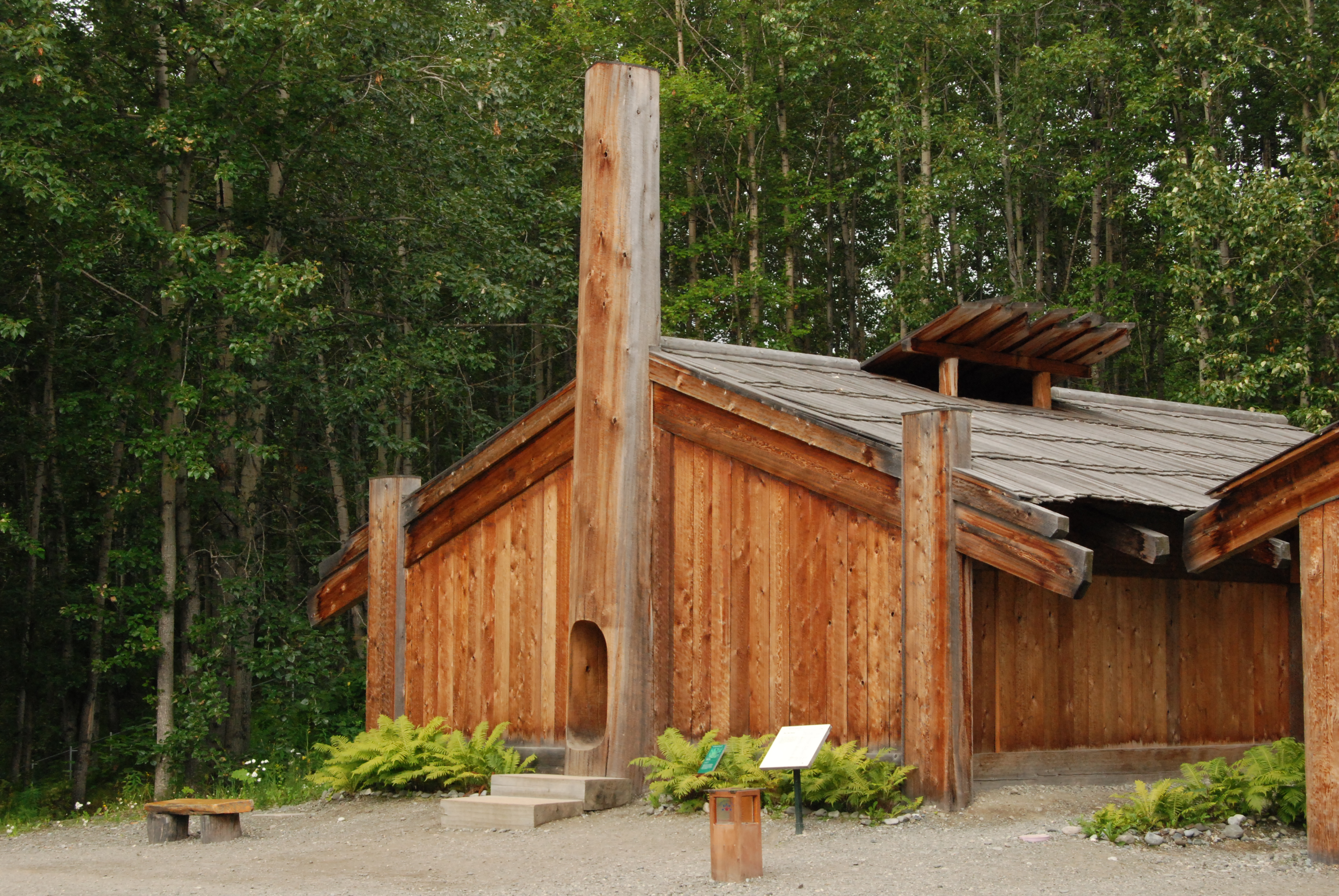
Replica plank house in the Eyak-Tlingit-Haida-Tsimshian village site, Alaska Native Heritage Center Museum

In 1778, during his third mapping voyage, James Cook described the homes he saw at Nootka Sound as not having a door. He described irregular openings through which the Indians passed in and out. The "Old Man House" had a maze "consisting of a series of parallel walls partly uncovering each other, around which the visitor had to pass." The maze ended in a dark area that housed the fire pit. One explanation for this configuration was as a defense against intruders. Alternately, because the lack of doors and the cedar mat room dividers did little to keep the wind and rain out, the mats may have served as windbreaks.

Anthropologist Ronald Leroy Olson, whose subjects were the Quinault, Tlingit and Kwakiutl tribes, defines the coasts of the Pacific Northwest as the place for rectangular plank houses, from the coastal region of British Columbia to the mouth of the Copper River in Alaska, with one exception: the Athabascan Tseutsaut of the head of Portland Canal, who used temporary brush and bark lodges. The Alaskan people are more likely to use spruce wood, which has characteristics similar to cedar, due to the availability of that resource. Cedar was the material of choice for the coastal people of southwestern Canada, and Washington, Oregon, and Northern California.
