= Walnut Grove, Washington =

- Neighborhood of Vancouver, Washington; Former census designated place
- Location of Walnut Grove
- Coordinates: 45°40′27″N 122°37′05″W
- Country: United States
- State: Washington
- County: Clark

Area
  - Total: 3.8 sq mi (9.9 km^{2})
  - Land: 3.8 sq mi (9.9 km^{2})
  - Water: 0 sq mi (0.0 km^{2})
- Elevation: 295 ft (90 m)

Population (2010)
  - Total: 9,790
  - Density: 2,557/sq mi (987.2/km^{2})
- Time zone: UTC-8 (Pacific (PST))
  - Summer (DST): UTC-7 (PDT)
- FIPS code: 53-76055
- GNIS feature ID: 2409527

Walnut Grove was a census-designated place (CDP) in Clark County, Washington, United States. The population was 9,790 at the 2010 census, up from 7,164 at the 2000 census.

== Geography ==
Walnut Grove was located in southern Clark County. The community was bordered by the city of Vancouver to the southeast and west, and by the suburbs of Minnehaha to the south, Hazel Dell to the west, Salmon Creek to the northwest, Barberton to the north, and Five Corners to the east.

According to the United States Census Bureau, the Walnut Grove CDP had a total area of 3.8 square miles (9.9 km^{2}), all of it land.

== Demographics ==
Historical population
Census	Pop.	Note	%±
1990	3,906		—
2000	7,164		83.4%
2010	9,790		36.7%

Walnut Grove first appeared as a census designated place in the 1990 U.S. census. The CDP was dissolved after being annexed to the city of Vancouver, Washington in 2017.

=== Racial and ethnic composition ===
Walnut Grove CDP, Washington – Racial and ethnic composition Note: the US Census treats Hispanic/Latino as an ethnic category. This table excludes Latinos from the racial categories and assigns them to a separate category. Hispanics/Latinos may be of any race.
Race / Ethnicity (NH = Non-Hispanic)	Pop 2000	Pop 2010	% 2000	% 2010
White alone (NH)	6,411	6,411	89.49%	89.49%
Black or African American alone (NH)	73	73	1.02%	1.02%
Native American or Alaska Native alone (NH)	52	52	0.73%	0.73%
Asian alone (NH)	223	223	3.11%	3.11%
Native Hawaiian or Pacific Islander alone (NH)	30	30	0.42%	0.42%
Other race alone (NH)	9	9	0.13%	0.13%
Mixed race or Multiracial (NH)	154	154	2.15%	2.15%
Hispanic or Latino (any race)	212	212	2.96%	2.96%
Total	7,164	7,164	100.00%	100.00%

=== 2000 census ===
As of the census of 2000, there were 7,164 people, 2,737 households, and 2,003 families residing in the CDP. The population density was 1,891.3 inhabitants per square mile (730.2/km^{2}). There were 2,848 housing units at an average density of 751.9 per square mile (290.3/km^{2}). The racial makeup of the CDP was 90.75% White, 1.12% African American, 0.80% Native American, 3.14% Asian, 0.47% Pacific Islander, 1.19% from other races, and 2.54% from two or more races. Hispanic or Latino of any race were 2.96% of the population. 17.2% were of German, 10.8% English, 10.6% American, 10.0% Irish and 5.4% Norwegian ancestry according to Census 2000.

There were 2,737 households, out of which 33.4% had children under the age of 18 living with them, 59.2% were married couples living together, 8.8% had a female householder with no husband present, and 26.8% were non-families. 20.1% of all households were made up of individuals, and 6.2% had someone living alone who was 65 years of age or older. The average household size was 2.61 and the average family size was 3.00.

In the CDP, the age distribution of the population shows 25.9% under the age of 18, 7.5% from 18 to 24, 30.6% from 25 to 44, 24.8% from 45 to 64, and 11.2% who were 65 years of age or older. The median age was 37 years. For every 100 females, there were 98.4 males. For every 100 females age 18 and over, there were 97.2 males.

The median income for a household in the CDP was $52,788, and the median income for a family was $56,125. Males had a median income of $45,752 versus $31,956 for females. The per capita income for the CDP was $25,747. About 3.8% of families and 6.1% of the population were below the poverty line, including 5.6% of those under age 18 and 4.6% of those age 65 or over.
