= Barberton, Washington =

- Census-designated place
- Location of Barberton, Washington
- Coordinates: 45°42′53″N 122°37′23″W
- Country: United States
- State: Washington
- County: Clark

Area
  - Total: 4.3 sq mi (11.2 km^{2})
  - Land: 4.3 sq mi (11.2 km^{2})
  - Water: 0 sq mi (0.0 km^{2})
- Elevation: 240 ft (73 m)

Population (2020)
  - Total: 8,567
  - Density: 1,980/sq mi (765/km^{2})
- Time zone: UTC-8 (Pacific (PST))
  - Summer (DST): UTC-7 (PDT)
- FIPS code: 53-04195
- GNIS feature ID: 2407796

Barberton is a census-designated place (CDP) in Clark County, Washington, United States. The population was 8,567 at the 2020 census.

Based on per capita income, one of the more reliable measures of affluence, Barberton ranks 90th of 522 areas in the state of Washington to be ranked.

== History ==
It was founded by 19th century pioneers, mostly from Ireland, who cut the forest down to clear land for farming. It was originally called St. John’s, after a church built in 1868 of the same name. According to historical accounts, Barberton was named after a man named Barber, who was the first postmaster of Barberton.

== Geography ==
Barberton is located in southwestern Clark County and is part of a cluster of unincorporated communities north of Vancouver. It is bordered by Mount Vista to the north and northwest, Brush Prairie to the east, Five Corners to the southeast, Walnut Grove to the south, and Salmon Creek to the southwest. Interstate 205 forms the southwest edge of the Barberton CDP, separating it from Salmon Creek and Walnut Grove. The closest access points to I-205 are Exit 32 in Walnut Grove to the south and Exit 36 in Mount Vista to the northwest. Downtown Vancouver is 9 miles (14 km) to the south of Barberton, and downtown Portland, Oregon, is 17 miles (27 km) to the south.

According to the United States Census Bureau, the Barberton CDP has a total area of 4.3 square miles (11.2 km^{2}), all of it land.

== Demographics ==
Historical population
Census	Pop.	Note	%±
2000	4,617		—
2010	5,661		22.6%
2020	8,567		51.3%
U.S. Decennial Census; 1990 2000 2010

Barberton first appeared as a census designated place in the 2000 U.S. census.

=== Racial and ethnic composition ===
Barberton CDP, Washington – Racial and ethnic composition Note: the US Census treats Hispanic/Latino as an ethnic category. This table excludes Latinos from the racial categories and assigns them to a separate category. Hispanics/Latinos may be of any race.
Race / Ethnicity (NH = Non-Hispanic)	Pop 2000	Pop 2010	Pop 2020	% 2000	% 2010	% 2020
White alone (NH)	4,245	4,904	6,753	91.94%	86.63%	78.83%
Black or African American alone (NH)	33	58	148	0.71%	1.02%	1.73%
Native American or Alaska Native alone (NH)	30	45	44	0.65%	0.79%	0.51%
Asian alone (NH)	101	167	468	2.19%	2.95%	5.46%
Native Hawaiian or Pacific Islander alone (NH)	7	15	17	0.15%	0.26%	0.20%
Other race alone (NH)	5	7	22	0.11%	0.12%	0.26%
Mixed race or Multiracial (NH)	84	155	484	1.82%	2.74%	5.65%
Hispanic or Latino (any race)	112	310	631	2.43%	5.48%	7.37%
Total	4,617	5,661	8,567	100.00%	100.00%	100.00%

=== 2010 census ===
As of the census of 2010, there were 5,661 people and 2,086 households in the CDP. The population density, as of the census of 2000 was 1,071.9 people per square mile (413.6/km^{2}). There were 1,658 housing units at an average density of 384.9/sq mi (148.5/km^{2}). The racial makeup of the CDP was 93.72% White, 0.71% African American, 0.65% Native American, 2.19% Asian, 0.15% Pacific Islander, 0.50% from other races, and 2.08% from two or more races. Hispanic or Latino of any race were 2.43% of the population. 23.9% were of German, 12.6% English, 11.2% Irish, 8.0% American and 5.8% Norwegian ancestry according to Census 2000.

There were 1,597 households, out of which 40.6% had children under the age of 18 living with them, 72.6% were married couples living together, 6.6% had a female householder with no husband present, and 17.1% were non-families. 13.0% of all households were made up of individuals, and 4.8% had someone living alone who was 65 years of age or older. The average household size was 2.89 and the average family size was 3.16.

In the CDP, the age distribution of the population shows 28.5% under the age of 18, 6.4% from 18 to 24, 27.7% from 25 to 44, 28.9% from 45 to 64, and 8.6% who were 65 years of age or older. The median age was 38 years. For every 100 females, there were 100.2 males. For every 100 females age 18 and over, there were 99.5 males.

The median income for a household in the CDP was $64,779, and the median income for a family was $67,054. Males had a median income of $51,396 versus $30,085 for females. The per capita income for the CDP was $25,066. About 1.6% of families and 2.5% of the population were below the poverty line, including 3.0% of those under age 18 and 9.0% of those age 65 or over.

== Education ==
Most of Barberton is in Battle Ground School District. A small portion is located in Vancouver Public Schools.

In regards to the section in the Battle Ground district, most of it is zoned to Pleasant Valley School for K-8, while a portion is zoned to Glenwood Heights Primary School and Laurin Middle School. All of it is zoned to Prairie High School.
