= Salmon Creek, Washington =

- Census-designated place
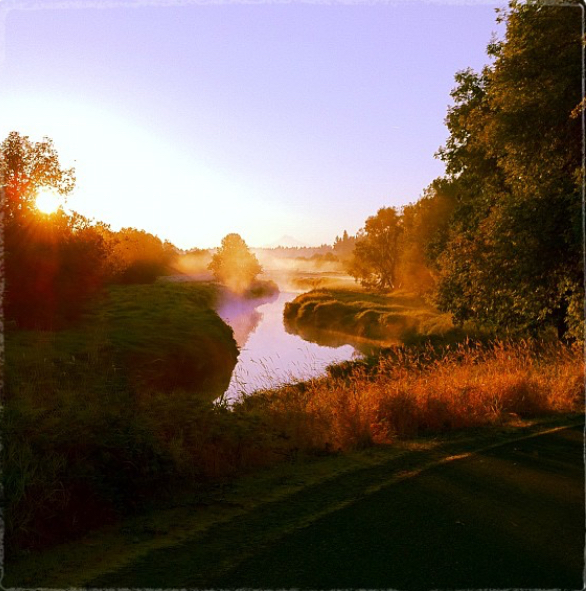
- Sunrise over Salmon Creek Regional Park

- Location of Salmon Creek, Washington
- Coordinates: 45°42′18″N 122°39′11″W
- Country: United States
- State: Washington
- County: Clark

Area
  - Total: 6.3 sq mi (16.4 km^{2})
  - Land: 6.3 sq mi (16.4 km^{2})
  - Water: 0 sq mi (0.0 km^{2})
- Elevation: 49 ft (15 m)

Population (2020)
  - Total: 21,293
  - Density: 3,360/sq mi (1,300/km^{2})
- Time zone: UTC-8 (Pacific (PST))
  - Summer (DST): UTC-7 (PDT)
- FIPS code: 53-61000
- GNIS feature ID: 2409239

Salmon Creek is a census-designated place (CDP) in Clark County, Washington, United States. The population was 21,293 at the 2020 census.

== Geography ==
Salmon Creek is located in southwestern Clark County. The community is bordered to the northeast by Mount Vista, to the east by Barberton, to the southeast by Walnut Grove, to the south by Hazel Dell, to the southwest by Lake Shore, and to the west by Felida. Downtown Vancouver is 6 miles (10 km) to the south.

According to the United States Census Bureau, the Salmon Creek CDP has a total area of 6.3 square miles (16.4 km^{2}), all of it land.

== Demographics ==
Historical population
Census	Pop.	Note	%±
1990	11,989		—
2000	16,767		39.9%
2010	19,686		17.4%
2020	21,293		8.2%

Salmon Creek first appeared as a census designated place in the 1990 U.S. census.

=== Racial and ethnic composition ===
Salmon Creek CDP, Washington – Racial and ethnic composition Note: the US Census treats Hispanic/Latino as an ethnic category. This table excludes Latinos from the racial categories and assigns them to a separate category. Hispanics/Latinos may be of any race.
Race / Ethnicity (NH = Non-Hispanic)	Pop 2000	Pop 2010	Pop 2020	% 2000	% 2010	% 2020
White alone (NH)	14,798	16,460	15,965	88.26%	83.61%	74.98%
Black or African American alone (NH)	206	291	433	1.23%	1.48%	2.03%
Native American or Alaska Native alone (NH)	72	109	139	0.43%	0.55%	0.65%
Asian alone (NH)	415	765	866	2.48%	3.89%	4.07%
Native Hawaiian or Pacific Islander alone (NH)	23	107	97	0.14%	0.54%	0.46%
Other race alone (NH)	21	28	102	0.13%	0.14%	0.48%
Mixed race or Multiracial (NH)	426	637	1,429	2.54%	3.24%	6.71%
Hispanic or Latino (any race)	806	1,289	2,262	4.81%	6.55%	10.62%
Total	16,767	19,686	21,293	100.00%	100.00%	100.00%

=== 2020 census ===
As of the 2020 census, Salmon Creek had a population of 21,293. The median age was 42.2 years. 21.9% of residents were under the age of 18 and 19.8% of residents were 65 years of age or older. For every 100 females there were 93.7 males, and for every 100 females age 18 and over there were 91.5 males age 18 and over.

100.0% of residents lived in urban areas, while 0.0% lived in rural areas.

There were 8,169 households in Salmon Creek, of which 30.1% had children under the age of 18 living in them. Of all households, 54.5% were married-couple households, 14.3% were households with a male householder and no spouse or partner present, and 24.7% were households with a female householder and no spouse or partner present. About 22.6% of all households were made up of individuals and 11.2% had someone living alone who was 65 years of age or older.

There were 8,373 housing units, of which 2.4% were vacant. The homeowner vacancy rate was 0.2% and the rental vacancy rate was 4.1%.

Racial composition as of the 2020 census
Race	Number	Percent
White	16,444	77.2%
Black or African American	445	2.1%
American Indian and Alaska Native	180	0.8%
Asian	887	4.2%
Native Hawaiian and Other Pacific Islander	102	0.5%
Some other race	918	4.3%
Two or more races	2,317	10.9%

=== 2000 census ===
As of the census of 2000, there were 16,767 people, 6,439 households, and 4,642 families residing in the CDP. The population density was 2,673.6 inhabitants per square mile (1,032.3/km^{2}). There were 6,756 housing units at an average density of 1,077.3 per square mile (415.9/km^{2}). The racial makeup of the CDP was 91.32% White, 1.26% African American, 0.54% Native American, 2.49% Asian, 0.14% Pacific Islander, 1.34% from other races, and 2.92% from two or more races. Hispanic or Latino of any race were 4.81% of the population. 18.0% were of German, 10.9% English, 10.9% Irish, 10.0% American and 6.3% Norwegian ancestry according to Census 2000.

There were 6,439 households, out of which 37.7% had children under the age of 18 living with them, 57.9% were married couples living together, 10.4% had a female householder with no husband present, and 27.9% were non-families. 22.3% of all households were made up of individuals, and 6.7% had someone living alone who was 65 years of age or older. The average household size was 2.60 and the average family size was 3.04.

In the CDP, the age distribution of the population shows 28.1% under the age of 18, 7.5% from 18 to 24, 28.4% from 25 to 44, 26.6% from 45 to 64, and 9.4% who were 65 years of age or older. The median age was 37 years. For every 100 females, there were 95.3 males. For every 100 females age 18 and over, there were 92.2 males.

The median income for a household in the CDP was $53,917, and the median income for a family was $62,989. Males had a median income of $48,766 versus $31,186 for females. The per capita income for the CDP was $23,673. About 6.6% of families and 8.4% of the population were below the poverty line, including 11.8% of those under age 18 and 3.5% of those age 65 or over.

== Education ==
Most of Salmon Creek is in Vancouver Public Schools. A small portion is located in Battle Ground School District.
