= Minnehaha, Washington =

- Census-designated place
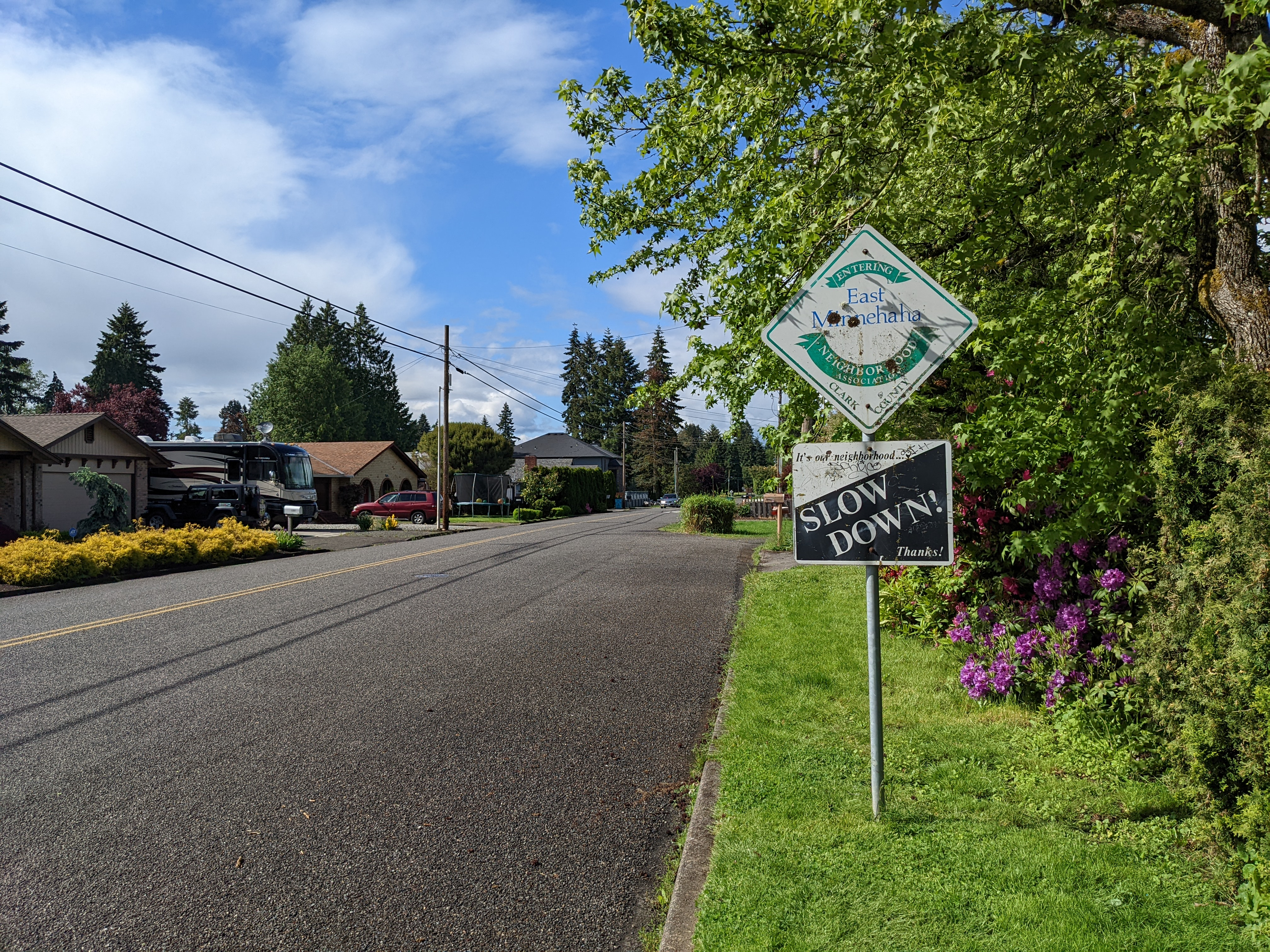
- East Minnehaha entrance sign

- Location of Minnehaha, Washington
- Coordinates: 45°39′25″N 122°37′35″W
- Country: United States
- State: Washington
- County: Clark

Area
  - Total: 2.23 sq mi (5.77 km^{2})
  - Land: 2.22 sq mi (5.75 km^{2})
  - Water: 0.0077 sq mi (0.02 km^{2})
- Elevation: 295 ft (90 m)

Population (2020)
  - Total: 11,871
  - Density: 5,350/sq mi (2,060/km^{2})
- Time zone: UTC-8 (Pacific (PST))
  - Summer (DST): UTC-7 (PDT)
- ZIP Code: 98661
- Area code(s): 360, 564
- FIPS code: 53-46125
- GNIS feature ID: 2408837

Minnehaha is a census-designated place (CDP) in Clark County, Washington, United States. The population was 11,871 at the 2020 census.

== Toponym ==
This area got its name from a Columbian newspaper editorial in 1891. The editor wrote about Burnt Bridge Creek and called it "Minnehaha, laughing water," from Longfellow's poem "The Song of Hiawatha". The name appealed to the citizenry and they kept it. Before that the area was called the "Black Forest" for its thick timber.

While Minnehaha, a Native American word, is often translated as "Laughing Water", the correct translation is "curling water" or "waterfall", as in Minnehaha Falls, Minnesota. The name comes from the Dakota language.

== Geography ==
Minnehaha is located in southwestern Clark County and is bordered on the west, south, and east by the city of Vancouver and on the north by Walnut Grove.

According to the United States Census Bureau, the Minnehaha CDP has a total area of 2.2 square miles (5.8 km^{2}), of which 0.01 square miles (0.02 km^{2}), or 0.26%, is water.

== Demographics ==
Historical population
Census	Pop.	Note	%±
1990	9,661		—
2000	7,689		−20.4%
2010	9,771		27.1%
2020	11,871		21.5%

Minnehaha first appeared as a census designated place in the 1990 U.S. census.

=== Racial and ethnic composition ===
Minnehaha CDP, Washington – Racial and ethnic composition Note: the US Census treats Hispanic/Latino as an ethnic category. This table excludes Latinos from the racial categories and assigns them to a separate category. Hispanics/Latinos may be of any race.
Race / Ethnicity (NH = Non-Hispanic)	Pop 2000	Pop 2010	Pop 2020	% 2000	% 2010	% 2020
White alone (NH)	6,652	7,855	8,392	86.51%	80.39%	70.69%
Black or African American alone (NH)	168	274	406	2.18%	2.80%	3.42%
Native American or Alaska Native alone (NH)	69	48	60	0.90%	0.49%	0.51%
Asian alone (NH)	215	482	558	2.80%	4.93%	4.70%
Native Hawaiian or Pacific Islander alone (NH)	47	52	91	0.61%	0.53%	0.77%
Other race alone (NH)	22	15	63	0.29%	0.15%	0.53%
Mixed race or Multiracial (NH)	201	273	825	2.61%	2.79%	6.95%
Hispanic or Latino (any race)	315	772	1,476	4.10%	7.90%	12.43%
Total	7,689	9,771	11,871	100.00%	100.00%	100.00%

=== 2020 census ===
As of the 2020 census, Minnehaha had a population of 11,871. The median age was 36.9 years. 23.7% of residents were under the age of 18 and 15.3% of residents were 65 years of age or older. For every 100 females there were 98.6 males, and for every 100 females age 18 and over there were 97.7 males age 18 and over.

100.0% of residents lived in urban areas, while 0.0% lived in rural areas.

There were 4,270 households in Minnehaha, of which 33.6% had children under the age of 18 living in them. Of all households, 48.9% were married-couple households, 17.8% were households with a male householder and no spouse or partner present, and 23.5% were households with a female householder and no spouse or partner present. About 20.7% of all households were made up of individuals and 9.0% had someone living alone who was 65 years of age or older.

There were 4,400 housing units, of which 3.0% were vacant. The homeowner vacancy rate was 0.9% and the rental vacancy rate was 3.5%.

Racial composition as of the 2020 census
Race	Number	Percent
White	8,711	73.4%
Black or African American	431	3.6%
American Indian and Alaska Native	113	1.0%
Asian	565	4.8%
Native Hawaiian and Other Pacific Islander	96	0.8%
Some other race	618	5.2%
Two or more races	1,337	11.3%

=== 2000 census ===
As of the census of 2000, there were 7,689 people, 2,795 households, and 2,031 families residing in the CDP. The population density was 3,464.1 people per square mile (1,337.3/km^{2}). There were 2,907 housing units at an average density of 1,309.7/sq mi (505.6/km^{2}). The racial makeup of the CDP was 88.28% White, 2.20% African American, 0.95% Native American, 2.81% Asian, 0.62% Pacific Islander, 2.09% from other races, and 3.04% from two or more races. Hispanic or Latino of any race were 4.10% of the population. 15.0% were of German, 13.2% English, 8.2% American and 7.8% Irish ancestry according to Census 2000.

There were 2,795 households, out of which 36.2% had children under the age of 18 living with them, 57.1% were married couples living together, 11.0% had a female householder with no husband present, and 27.3% were non-families. 20.9% of all households were made up of individuals, and 7.7% had someone living alone who was 65 years of age or older. The average household size was 2.75 and the average family size was 3.18.

In the CDP, the age distribution of the population shows 28.6% under the age of 18, 7.7% from 18 to 24, 28.6% from 25 to 44, 24.3% from 45 to 64, and 10.8% who were 65 years of age or older. The median age was 36 years. For every 100 females, there were 97.2 males. For every 100 females age 18 and over, there were 95.2 males.

The median income for a household in the CDP was $46,766, and the median income for a family was $50,585. Males had a median income of $39,167 versus $28,984 for females. The per capita income for the CDP was $20,023. About 8.9% of families and 11.3% of the population were below the poverty line, including 15.9% of those under age 18 and 7.0% of those age 65 or over.

== Education ==
It is within Vancouver Public Schools. The district operates Minnehaha Elementary School, as well as Harry S Truman Elementary School.
