= Henry Hodges (disambiguation) =

Henry Hodges (born 1993) is an American actor and singer.

Henry Hodges may also refer to:

- Henry Hodges (jurist) (1844–1919), Australian judge
- Henry C. Hodges (1831–1917), US Army officer
- Henry Clay Hodges Jr. (1860–1963), US Army officer
- Henry Eugene Hodges (born 1966), American serial killer
- Henry W. M. Hodges (1920–1997), British archaeologist

== See also ==
- Henry Hodge (1944–2009), English judge
