= John McNeil Eddings =

John McNeil Eddings (c. 1830–1896) was the military storekeeper at Fort Vancouver, and a prominent civic leader of Clark County in what was then the Washington Territory.

== Early years ==
Born in Ballintry, Antrim County, Ireland (near Belfast), in 1830, Eddings immigrated to the United States with his parents in 1841. They lived in New York initially, then moved to St. Louis, Missouri. John Eddings enlisted on July 17, 1851, in the U.S. Army Infantry, Fourth Regiment, at Fort Gratiot, Michigan. As a first sergeant he came with that regiment to Vancouver Barracks by way of the Isthmus of Panama in 1851. On that journey were also Ulysses S. Grant, Benjamin Bonneville, Henry C. Hodges, and Louis Sohns From 1855 to 1856, Eddings fought in the Rogue River Wars in Southern Oregon Territory. Mrs. Mary Nicholas, a daughter of John Eddings, gave this account to Clark Brown in his Columbian newspaper column Visiting Around:

I told you my father was a man who loved adventure, and he found plenty in the Indian wars. My father had fiery red hair. He went to the Rogue River Indian War and when he came back his hair was snowy white. The scalping, the dead soldiers, and their lack of equipment was just too much for him.

== Service in Vancouver ==
Eddings was appointed military storekeeper by Captain Rufus Ingalls (later a General) in 1857. The position of storekeeper for the Fort was one of considerable importance to the Fort. He was responsible for purchases of all goods and armaments, storage management, and maintenance of the facilities at the Fort. Fort Vancouver was the main depot from which troops were supplied to the Northwest region. Eddings served in this position for thirty years.

In November, 1865, Eddings was elected to the Vancouver City Council, serving for two years. Near the end of the term, it is indicated that he was appointed to the Committee for Cemetery Improvements, serving with Joseph M. Fletcher and G. W. Durgin, with the committee putting a picket fence around the city cemetery.

In September, 1866, a volunteer fire company was organized in Vancouver, its first, and Eddings was among the officers and founders, along with other leaders in the community. There had been a recent fire in downtown Vancouver, which consumed a number of businesses and residences, due in part to the lack of fire services in the city. On May 11, 1867, the City Council, with Eddings a member, created a Fire Department of the City of Vancouver.

In July, 1875, Eddings also took on the job of Postmaster for Vancouver, serving for the next eleven years in addition to his other military and civic duties. Edding’s daughter, Mrs. Mary Nichols, has provided an insight into living in this period in Vancouver, Washington:

The incoming mail came by carriers. There were no trains at that time. We knew by the whistle of the steam boat when the mail came by river. It also came by stage and on horseback carriers. It was a little uncertain just when it would come. People would come for a long way to get their mail, and mother always had coffee for the people who came after it, a treat they all relished.

== Social and Family ==
On December 20, 1853, a baby girl, Josephine Eddings, was born to John and Sarah Eddings, in one of the original log cabins of Fort Vancouver. While this was not the first baby born in Vancouver, it was the first born in Vancouver within the new United States Territory of Washington. The Washington Territory had been recently created, on March 2, 1853, carved out of what had been the Oregon Territory. There is a popular local story that Josephine’s name was the result of a vote by the officers of the Fort. They had been following the events of Napoleon's career, and wanted the new baby to be named after the French General's wife. This may be confusing though, as Napoleon I, who was married to Josephine, died in 1821, and it was Napoleon III, his nephew, that was in the news in 1853–1854. But the story remains popular with local historians anyway, including a plaque commemorating this event and story being placed on Officers Row in Vancouver, Washington.

John Eddings and his large family were active members of St. Luke's Episcopal Church. Eddings was one of the founders at its consecration in 1860, and served for twelve years in the church leadership, working with two of the church’s priests, John D. McCarty and Albert S. Nicholson.

In 1866 the Vancouver Hibernian Benevolent Society, an Irish social organization, elected John Eddings President for the ensuing year. He remained active in this organization.

When Grant came to Vancouver in 1879, the former president visited with both Louis Sohns and John Eddings. When Eddings died on March 31, 1896, his was one of the most highly attended funerals in the history of Vancouver. The 14th Infantry Band led a procession stretching nearly a half mile in addition to a large contingent of carriages with relatives and friends.
