= John D. McCarty =

American religious leader (1798–1881)

- Born: June 7, 1798; Rhinebeck, New York, U.S.
- Died: May 10, 1881 (aged 82); Washington, D.C., U.S.
- Resting place: Rock Creek Cemetery; Washington, D.C., U.S.
- Spouse: Lussanah (died 1879)
- Military career
- Allegiance: United States
- Branch: United States Army
- Conflicts: Mexican–American War

John D. McCarty (June 7, 1798 – May 10, 1881) was the first missionary Episcopal priest in the Washington Territory. He served as the only United States Army chaplain at the front during the Mexican War. He was instrumental in founding and establishing numerous Episcopal churches in Western New York and the Northwest.

== Early years ==
McCarty was born on June 7, 1798, in Rhinebeck, New York. As a young man, he studied law and briefly practiced for three years. He then decided to enter the ordained ministry of the Protestant Episcopal Church. On March 3, 1825, McCarty joined the United States Navy as an acting chaplain, shipping out on the U.S.S. Constitution which was participating in an anti-piracy campaign as a part of the Mediterranean Squadron. McCarty was ordained deacon on December 23, 1825. He left the Navy on April 21, 1826. On October 26, 1827, he was ordained a priest in the Protestant Episcopal Church by Bishop John H. Hobart. He began his work as a missionary in Oswego County, New York, where he remained until 1845.

During his time in Oswego County, Reverend McCarty was active in missionary work, visiting and providing services in many towns and villages, and founding and building a number of Episcopal churches. On May 28, 1828, he laid the cornerstone of Christ Church (Protestant Episcopal), Oswego, New York. On June 22, 1835, he organized Zion Church (Protestant Episcopal) in Fulton, New York, and laid the cornerstone of its new building on August 6, 1836. Reverend McCarty was rector at both of these churches, living at the rectory at Christ Church.

== Mexican–American War chaplain ==
When the Mexican–American War broke out in 1846, McCarty resigned as rector of Christ Church and at the age of 48 enlisted in the United States Army, as a brigade chaplain for the Second Brigade, First Division. Chaplain McCarty was the only brigade chaplain in the Mexican–American War, and the only official chaplain to be stationed at the front in Mexico.

He was known as a chaplain who was deeply involved with the troops, not hesitating to go into battle with them. During one battalion march across corn fields and ditches, Chaplain McCarty was the first to start tearing down growing corn stalks and throwing them in ditches to make the effort safer and faster for the troops. During the Battle of Churubusco, August 20, 1847, Chaplain McCarty distinguished himself by ignoring the heavy fire, in order to console the wounded and encouraging the other men to go on fighting. McCarty did not agree with war, but as a chaplain he insisted that "when duty called, personal earnestness and bravery should be manifested in the chaplain as well as in the officers of the line". Chaplain McCarty thus insisted on going with the fighting troops into battle. The troops called him "the fighting parson". When they were fording a stream he was quoted as saying "Boys, this is an unholy war, but be careful to keep your powder boxes up and not get your powder wet."

Major General Winfield Scott, commander of the U.S. Army in Mexico, called McCarty one of the bravest men in the Army. Along with General Scott, Chaplain McCarty was one of only two honorary members of the Aztec Club of 1847. After the Mexican War, Chaplain McCarty was stationed at Jefferson Barracks, Missouri, from 1848 until 1852.

== Northwest Missionary Priest ==
The Domestic and Foreign Missionary Society of the Protestant Episcopal Church appointed Reverend McCarty a missionary in 1852. He was sent to be the rector of Trinity Episcopal Church in Portland, OR (which is now Trinity Episcopal Cathedral (Portland, Oregon)). He reached Portland, Oregon, traveling by ship and passing through Panama, on Jan. 19, 1853, to begin his ministry. At this time, this was the Oregon Territory, with the separation into Oregon and Washington occurring on February 8, 1853.

Soldiers across the Columbia River at the U.S. Army Fort Vancouver knew Reverend McCarty from his service as a brigade chaplain in the Mexican War. So they asked him to also minister to them at their station. Reverend McCarty would spend part of the week at Trinity Church, then on Sunday afternoon cross the river. He would then minister to both the Hudson's Bay Company Fort Vancouver and the adjacent U.S. Army Fort Vancouver, and also at the village of Vancouver.

In several stories about Reverend McCarty's missionary travels in the northwest, repeated by bishops, writers, and in his own letters, it illustrated his willingness to endure hardship, long travels on foot, and sometimes severe weather. To get from Portland, Oregon to Vancouver, Washington each week, Reverend McCarty needed to use three ferries and walk over twenty miles through the wilderness. Sometimes the ferries that crossed smaller waterways (called sloughs locally) didn't run, so McCarty would have to wade through the cold waters to continue his journey. On trips to northern Washington, he was sometimes forced to sleep in burnt out logs to get out of snowstorms. His missionary trips took him to all parts of Oregon and Washington, mostly on foot or by boat on inland streams and rivers. He was in his mid-fifties at this time. To provide some insight to the conditions of the day, the following is an excerpt from a report Reverend McCarty made to the Missionary Society in 1853:

“May 16th I set out on an extensive tour of exploration and Missionary duty into the new Territory of Washington, which is separated from Oregon by the Columbia River. I went by steamboat down this river to the mouth of the Cowlitz River up the same against a strong current; in an Indian canoe, about thirty-three miles to Cowlitz Landing then on horseback to Steilacoom, a military post on the east side of Puget Sound.” Later in the report he indicated providing services over the next days to those in the village of Olympia, Cowlitz Landing, Fort Nisqually, and Monticello. At the end of the report he summarizes “Taking a steamer up the Columbia, I reached Portland the 2nd of June, after an absence of fourteen days, having traveled three hundred and twenty-five miles. Of these, ninety was by steamer, sixty-eight by canoe, and one hundred and sixty-seven on horseback. The roads for a part of the distance were barely passable. During the tour I officiated six times in five places, in all of which, I believe, the service of our Church had never before been performed.”

As was typical of the times, it is likely he travelled at a great discount or free, borrowed transportation, and was guided by interested persons or those traders going in the same direction. In 1854, McCarty was transferred by the U.S. Army to Fort Steilacoom, Washington Territory. In addition to his chaplaincy at Fort Steilacoom, McCarty also conducted services in Steilacoom, in Olympia, Washington at the House of Representatives, which later formed into St. John's Episcopal Church (Olympia, Washington), and a number of other locations throughout northern Washington. On July 14, 1855, the Reverend John McCarty, the only Episcopal clergy in the Washington Territory, conducted services in Seattle's small frame Methodist church. This was the first recorded Episcopal service held in pioneer Seattle.

== Creating family ties ==
In late 1855, McCarty took an extended leave to travel back East. He returned in April 1856 with a wife, the widow Lussanah, and her children who he had adopted. Initially they went to Fort Steilacoom, but then transferred back to Fort Vancouver in 1857.

In addition to his chaplaincy duties at the fort, Reverend McCarty conducted Episcopal services in a converted schoolhouse within the city of Vancouver, Washington. This is the beginning of St. Luke's Episcopal Church. Reverend McCarty settled down in Vancouver, retaining his chaplaincy in the U.S. Army at Fort Vancouver, and helping to build St. Luke's. The chaplaincy however required that Reverend McCarty minister to the troops in the field also. In 1859 Reverend McCarty traveled through territory recently involved in the Indian wars into Eastern Washington, to Fort Walla Walla, conducting the first Episcopal services there. He also conducted services in the surrounding community, as well as ministered in the field to those wounded and killed as a part of the various Indian wars occurring during this time.

On May 27, 1860, he arranged for St. Luke's to be the first Episcopal church in the Washington Territory to be consecrated, by then Bishop Thomas F. Scott. Joseph M. Fletcher, a prominent local attorney, was elected the church's Sr. Warden at that time. A number of local civic leaders, including Louis Sohns, Henry C. Hodges, and John McNeil Eddings joined and became part of the church leadership. The church building was a converted schoolhouse located at East Fifth and West Reserve, outside of Fort Vancouver in Vancouver, Washington. Reverend McCarty continued to build the parish at St. Luke's, serving as its first rector.

Reverend McCarty's oldest daughter, Mary McCarty, was married to James Crawford, a prominent local businessman and a vestry member of St. Luke's. Crawford was the partner of Charles W. Slocum, in the firm of Crawford & Slocum Co., which had business dealings in many parts of the Pacific Northwest.

== Retirement ==
On September 16, 1867, Reverend McCarty was retired by the U.S. Army as a chaplain. On April 8, 1868, he resigned as rector at St. Luke's, and he and his wife Lussanah moved east to Washington, D.C., to live with their son. In 1873, the McCartys returned to Vancouver to participate in the dedication of a new church building for St. Luke's, built in the previous year. The Reverend and Mrs. McCarty remained in Vancouver for another two years, with Reverend McCarty assisting his successor at St. Luke's, Reverend Albert S. Nicholson. In 1875, the McCartys returned to Washington, D.C.

== Death ==
On January 22, 1879, Lussanah McCarty died in Washington, D.C. On May 10, 1881, Reverend John D. McCarty died in Washington, D.C. His funeral at St. Mark's Church at Capitol Hill, Washington, D.C. was attended by many of the soldiers (some of which had become generals) he had served with in Mexico and Vancouver. He was buried at Rock Creek Cemetery outside of the city.

== Character ==
Reverend McCarty was regarded highly by many persons, which gives some indication of his character. Captain Edward D. Townsend, who considered McCarty a celebrity, wrote that he had the pleasure of hearing him preach in November 1855 in a room fitted up as a theatre at the Vancouver Barracks. Townsend, later the army's adjutant general, was destined to be pallbearer at McCarty's funeral. Joseph M. Fletcher is quoted as saying, "If a stranger arrived in town Dr. McCarty would find him out and speak words of welcome and cheer. McCarty could be found soothing the sick and helping the distressed, and that too without show or parade."
