= Albert S. Nicholson =

American civil leader (1829–1893)

Albert S. Nicholson (1829 – May 29, 1893) was a prominent religious leader of Clark County in what was then the Washington Territory, as well as a civic leader and educator.

== Early years ==
Albert S. Nicholson was born in Salem Corners, Wayne County, Pennsylvania in 1829. At 21 he left his farm home and taught school for some time in Ohio. From childhood, he had a desire to enter the ministry and while living in the family of Dr. Van Ingen in St. Paul, Minnesota. He was induced by Dr. Van Ingen to enter the theological seminary Nashotah House. Although he had already been baptized, he insisted on the rite being repeated by immersion in one of the lakes of Nashotah, Wisconsin by Bishop Jackson Kemper. He graduated from the seminary in 1860, received deacon's orders and immediately took charge of Christ Episcopal Church, Delavan, Wisconsin. He seems always to have had the urge for teaching and in the autumn of 1861, opened a school in Delavan. In this year he was ordained an Episcopal priest and in 1862 was married to Mary Elvira Warner, a native of Michigan. In 1863, Rev. and Mrs. Nicholson went westward across the plains and settled in Stockton, California, where Nicholson opened a school. Their son Lawson Nicholson was born in 1866 and later became City Engineer of Tacoma. In 1867, Nicholson became rector of Christ Church, Napa, California, now called St. Mary's Episcopal Church.

== Service in Vancouver ==
It was in 1868 that Nicholson, with his wife and son, embarked from San Francisco in the steamer Oriflamme for Washington Territory. He was being called to become the second rector of St. Luke's Episcopal Church, Vancouver, Washington Territory. While in Vancouver he worked extensively with Bishop Benjamin Wistar Morris to build the Episcopal faith in the Northwest. When Nicholson came to Vancouver, church services were still being held in the little building which had been consecrated by Reverend John D. McCarty in 1860. With assistance by church and community leaders, including Joseph M. Fletcher, Louis Sohns, Henry C. Hodges, and John McNeil Eddings, money for the new church was raised by subscription (a term used then for church donations) and the sale of the lot where the first church stood. Rev. Nicholson also donated a collection of minerals to be sold and the amount applied to the building fund. This new church building was first occupied for services in March 1873, with Reverend John D. McCarty returning from retirement back East to provide the first sermon in the church. This was an incomplete structure at this time, with a temporary chancel constructed, and the seats from the old church still in use in this new building. The nave was to be 56×36 feet, and have a tower and spire 100 feet high. It took almost three years to finally complete the building structure. Nicholson's annual salary of $350 was paid by the national Episcopal Church, and he was to receive also certain endowment interest and the Sunday offerings, after incidental expenses were extracted. In most months, Nicholson did not receive the full amount due, and donated in addition to the building fund. This was typical of missionary priests at this time in the Northwest. In April 1875, Nicholson became the publisher and editor of The Oregon Churchman, a local church semi-monthly newspaper published under the supervision of Bishop Morris of the Oregon Episcopal Diocese. This was in addition to his other duties at St. Luke's and local education efforts in the community. On April 6, 1877, a new mission was started at Mill Plain, Washington Territory, about eight miles east of Vancouver. Nicholson helped to start the mission and Sunday School when he learned of interest and need from neighbors in that area. Roads being still primitive in that area, it was too far to attend services in Vancouver. Nicholson delivered the first service, baptized a child, and contributed books and papers to the School. At the service were over sixty persons, representing various Christian denominations, yet no members of the Episcopal Church. The School was nevertheless supported by both St. Luke's members and the Missionary Diocese of Oregon. In 1879, Nicholson voluntarily withdrew his parish from the list of missionary status under the Protestant Episcopal Church General Board, saying to them "This parish is in a growing and prosperous condition." Thus, St. Luke's became the first completely self-supporting Episcopal parish in the Washington Territory. On August 24, 1881, the first convocation of the missionary district of Washington (new Episcopal Missionary Diocese) was held at St. Luke's, with Bishop John A. Paddock presiding and Bishop Morris as honored guest, and Nicholson as secretary. Among the officers of the convention was the St. Luke's Senior Warden who had worked extensively with Reverend Nicholson, Joseph M. Fletcher, as treasurer Diocesan Board of Missions. As a part of the convention, the new church building at St. Luke's was consecrated by Bishop Paddock.

== Educator ==
Shortly after Reverend and Mrs. Nicholson arrived in Vancouver they were asked by a number of citizens if they would undertake the work of a school in connection with the church. As a result, St. Luke's Parish School for Girls was opened with Mrs. Nicholson as the primary teacher, and Rev. Nicholson as the principal. An accomplished musician, Mrs. Nicholson was the teacher of vocal and instrumental music in the school and the church choir director. While other teachers assisted Mrs. Nicholson, she brought Miss Amanda Loomis out from back East to be the primary teacher in 1873, and the principal, while Mrs. Nicholson continued as the music teacher. The attendance at the school averaged about forty pupils during most of the years, until Miss Loomis' retirement in 1889. The Nicholson family moved to Tacoma, and Miss Loomis retired, so the now named St. Luke's Parish School closed in 1893. Reverend Nicholson furthered education in the community by co-founding the Clarke County Educational Society, and serving as a vice president and frequent speaker on educational administration. He also served as an elected Superintendent of Schools for Clark County.

== Later years ==
In August 1886, Nicholson resigned from St. Luke's Vancouver and moved to Tacoma to become the rector of Old St. Peters, Tacoma, Washington. He also took charge of the Fannie C. Paddock Memorial Hospital, which had been founded earlier in 1882 by Bishop John A. Paddock in honor of his late wife. Bishop and Mrs. Paddock had been frequent visitors to St. Luke's while Reverend Nicholson was there, with a memorial window dedicated to Mrs. Paddock in 1882. Nicholson died May 29, 1893, and was buried at St. Sylvanus at Hillhurst, near Tacoma Washington.
