= St. John's Episcopal Church (Olympia, Washington) =

Parish in Olympia, Washington

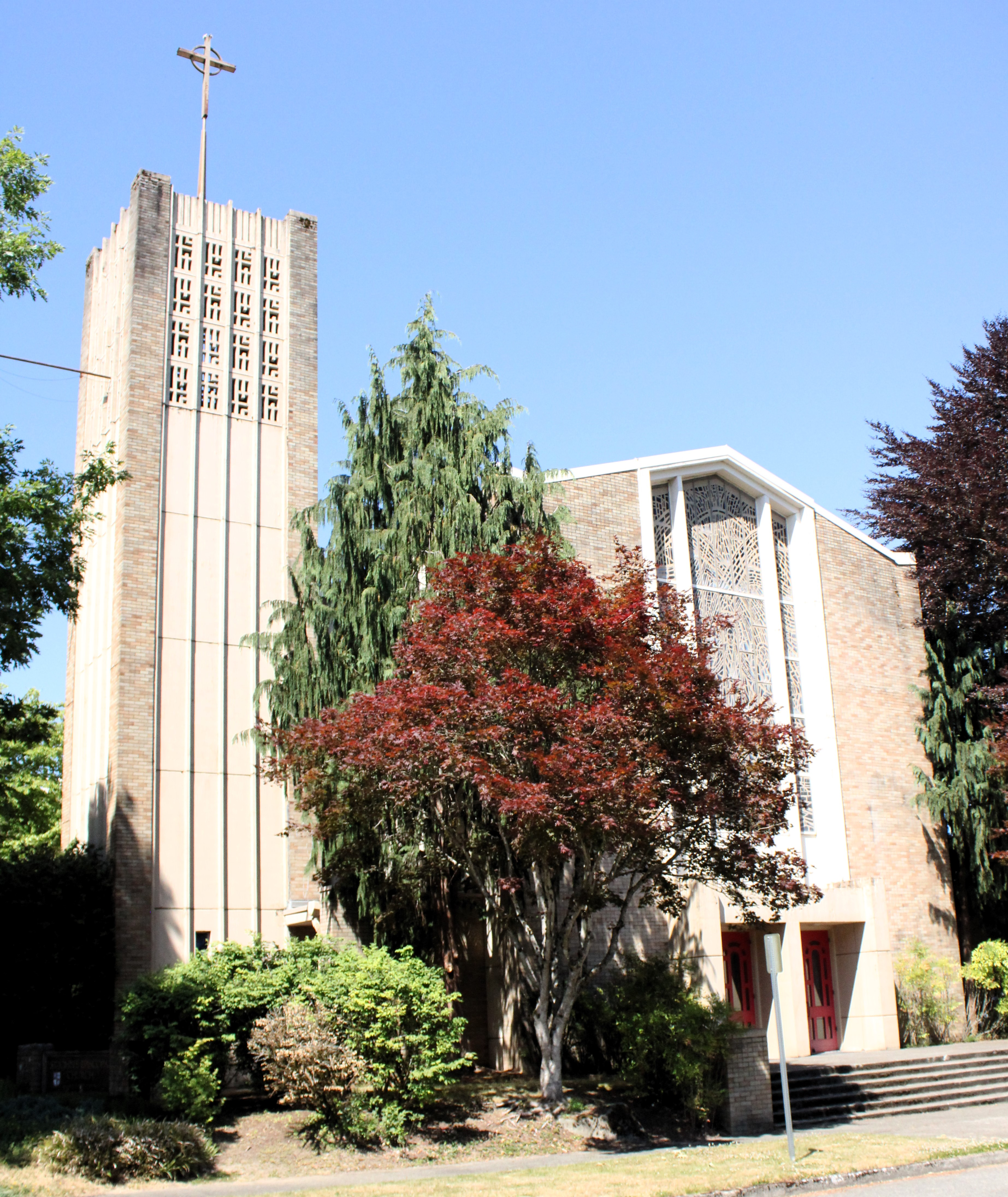
- St. John's Episcopal Church, 2023

- Location within Washington (state)
- 47°01′52″N 122°54′01″W
- Location: Olympia, Washington
- Country: United States
- Denomination: Episcopal Church of America

St. John's Episcopal Church is a parish of the Episcopal Church of America located in Olympia, Washington. The parish is part of the Episcopal Diocese of Olympia.

== History ==
In 1853, Rev. John D. McCarty came as a missionary for the Protestant Episcopal Church to the Northwest. This included many areas of Oregon and Washington, including Olympia, Washington Territory. He conducted services in the Hall of the Representatives. On May 26, 1854, McCarty and Bishop Thomas F. Scott arrived in Olympia. McCarty continued onto Steilacoom for services, and Bishop Scott conducted Sunday services in Olympia. Rev. McCarty returned after that on a monthly basis to conduct services in Olympia. On January 7, 1864, the Washington Territory State Legislature passed an act to incorporate St. John's Episcopal Church. Actually, the incorporation papers specifically indicated "Rector, Wardens And Vestrymen Of The Parish Of St. John's Church Of Olympia" The only church organization incorporated earlier than St. John's was the Catholic Archdiocese of Seattle, so in one way St. John's was the first parish to be incorporated.

The first regularly appointed missionary for St. John's was Rev. D. Ellis Willes. He arrived in June, 1860, and conducted services in the local Methodist Chapel, which was the first church building in Olympia. Rev. Willes resigned in 1861, with monthly services subsequently conducted by Rev. Daniel Kendig, the chaplain at Fort Steilacoom, until Rev. Peter Edward Hyland arrived in 1865.

The church building was consecrated by Bishop Scott on Sep. 3, 1865, and two persons, Mrs. Robert Frost and Mrs. Charles (Martha) Grainger were confirmed. Also that day, Rev. Hyland married William Glendenning of Seattle to Jane Connor of Olympia. "Accompanying the above was a most generous supply of wine and cake. As we regretfully gaze at the empty bottles and the remnants of the bridal loaf we waft them out best wishes for happiness" said the Washington Standard of Sep. 9 of this event.

On April 2, 1866, St John's became the oldest incorporated parish in the state of Washington when a meeting of the congregation was held and the parish formally constituted. The Rev. Peter E. Hyland was the rector, and the following were on the vestry: Sam W. Percival, Senior Warden; William Pickering, Junior Warden; and James R. Wood, Robert Frost, Frank Henry, Richard Lane, Benjamin Harned, and John L. Head as vestrymen.

Rev. Hyland served until 1871, when he became the Chaplain of the Washington Territory State Legislature. He was followed by a series of ministers who served the church. At times the services were performed by lay ministers, as was the case prior to 1878 when Governor Elisha P. Ferry performed that role. Additionally these rectors included Rev. Dr. Reuben Nevius, the first Registrar of the Diocese of Olympia, and Rev. Thomas E. Jessett, a prominent historian of the Northwest.

Mrs. Rebecca G. Howard, a well-known Olympia proprietor of the Pacific House, and a faithful communicant and liberal supporter of St John's died July 12, 1881. The following story was told about her:

Upon one of his visits Bishop Benjamin Morris brought Mrs. Morris and two of his sisters-in-law to the service. Mrs. Morris and her sisters took a pew which happened to be the one always occupied by Mrs. Howard. A few minutes later Mrs. Howard came in, dressed in all her finery and found her pew occupied by strangers. She took a place a few pews away and then turned and stared at Mrs. Morris and her sisters until they, embarrassed, moved into another pew. Mrs. Howard then triumphantly marched into her accustomed place.

== Notable early members ==
- Elisha P. Ferry, Washington Territory Governor, first Washington State Governor
- William Pickering, fifth Washington Territory Governor
- Benjamin Harned, local carpenter and builder, Treasurer of Washington Territory
- Rev. Thomas E. Jessett, noted historian and archivist
- John D. McCarty, missionary priest, chaplain, first priest at St. John's
- Samuel W. Percival, sea captain, businessman, civic leader
- Rev. Reuben Nevius, first Registrar of the Diocese of Olympia

== Buildings ==
As noted, the early services for the parish were conducted in the State Legislature hall, schoolhouses, and lodges. In December, 1863, the ladies of the congregation, organized as the "Sewing Society", held a fair to raise funds for a church building. Members of the St. John's congregation purchased a lot and buildings from Benjamin Harned at 7th and Main Street (now Capitol Way), the land being part of the current Governor Hotel. The first church building was a converted carpentry shop, occupied beginning in 1865.

In 1870 Mrs. T. F. McElroy organized her Sunday School class of girls into "The Busy Bees." On March 23, 1875, at a meeting of "The Dime & Sewing Society" Mr. O'Brien introduced the subject of "employing a sexton for the Church to ring the Bell, make fires and light the lamps: the Busy Bees generously offering to keep the Church clean." In 1878 a rectory was built by James Stewart at a cost of $1800 gold coin raised by "The Dime Society" and the "Busy Bees."

The St. John's Episcopal Church women's groups are recognized for their contributions to the Olympia area in a registration in the National Register of Historic Places ("Women's History in Olympia: First Settlement 1846 to 1948"). The registration document states "Women were often deeply involved in the establishment and support of local churches. Without their organizational and fund raising abilities, the churches would not have existed." The document goes on to provide specific examples, taken from the history of St. John's women's groups.

On April 23, 1888, the old church building and its site was sold for $1500 and plans were made to build a 2nd church. In May the bids were put out publicly for builders, using the plans laid out by the architect, C. N. Daniels. The final cost of the new building was $10,361.75, and was located at present day Washington & 9th in downtown Olympia. (The Church is now the 1st Baptist church, which still has some of the original furnishings including the beautiful stained glass Rose window which was made in England. ) The Rector, the Rev. Horace Buck, equipped the church by writing to friends in former parishes. Some of these furnishings were the baptismal font of carved oak from St. Thomas church in New Haven Connecticut, and the eagle lectern which was the gift of a former parishioner, Mrs. Fanny Mary Wilkinson of Tacoma, daughter of Judge Elwood Evans. From the old church came the bell, the stained glass window of St. John and St Mary, and the Bishop's and Rector's chairs which had come around the Strait of Magellan in earlier days. The opening of the new church and the dedication of these furnishings was held July 19, 1891. The carpet for the chancel and cushions for the pews were supplied by St. John's Guild. To raise money for them they made sheets and pillow slips and hemmed curtains for the first Olympian Hotel; bound blankets for the National Guard of Washington; had teas and garden parties; gave bazaars and excursions.

St. John's Episcopal Church moved to its current location at 20th and Capitol Way in 1960. Included in the buildings are many traditional and abstract style stained glass windows. The church facility also contains many artifacts from the second church facility.

Due to major structural needs, including seismic upgrades, the need for a new emergency and fire alarm system, and numerous other challenges, the church community, led by Rev. Dr. Janet Waggoner, announced that the church and related property would be put up for sale for $19 million. The faith community plans to move out of the facility in mid 2027 and is raising money to either buy or build a new facility.
