= Charles Prosch =

American newspaper publisher (1822–1913)

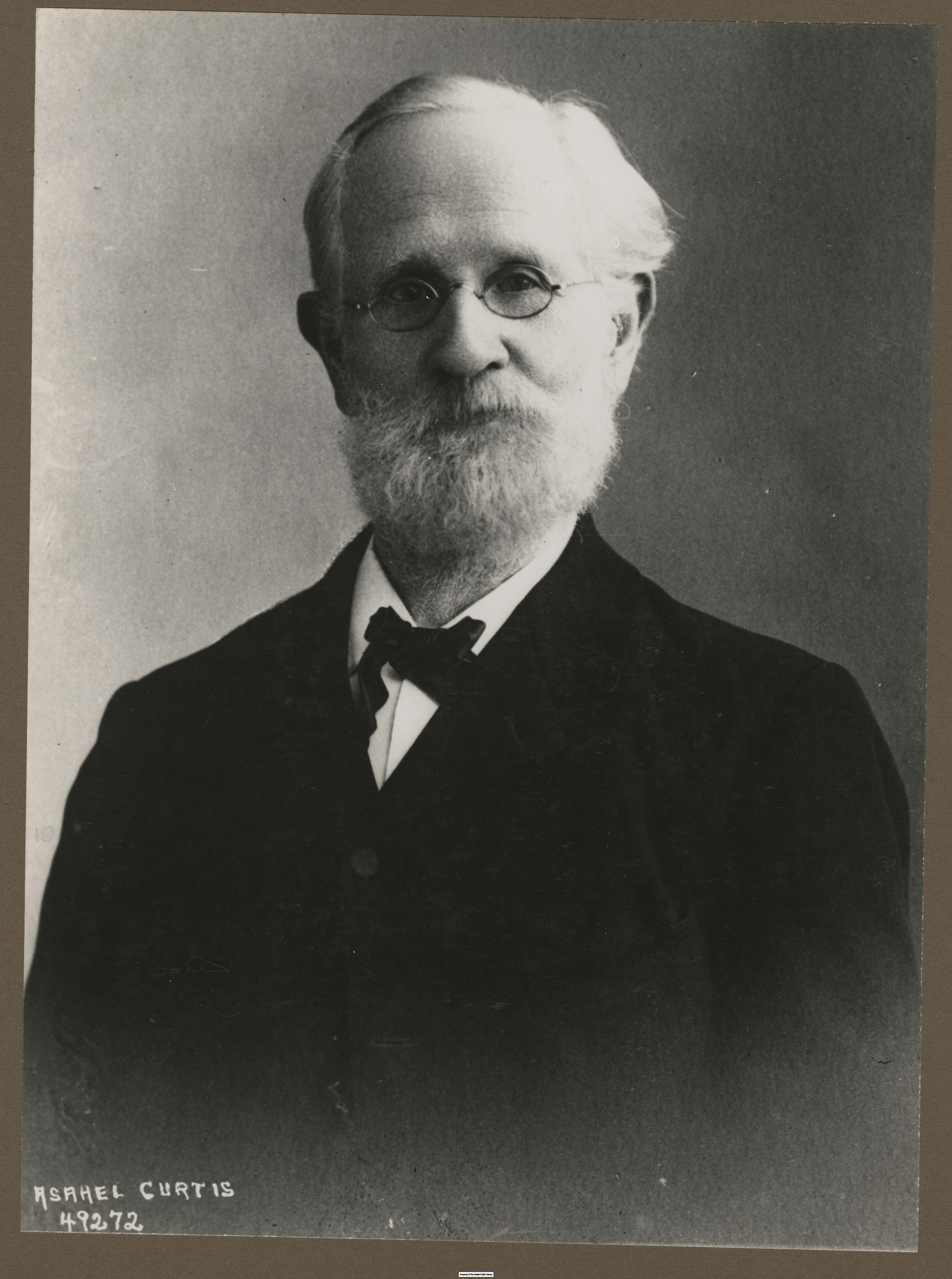
Charles Prosch, c. 1897

Charles Prosch (1822–1913) was a pioneering newspaper publisher in the state of Washington, located in the Pacific Northwest. He wrote Reminiscences of Washington Territory: Scenes, Incidents and Reflections of the Pioneer Period on Puget Sound.

Prosch founded the Puget Sound Herald in Steilacoom, Washington. He and two of his sons acquired the Pacific Tribune in Olympia. His son Thomas Wickham Prosch acquired the Intelligencer in Seattle and after its merger owned the Post-Intelligencer.

== Career ==
In 1866 Randall H. Hewitt sold the Pacific Tribune to Prosch.

Mrs. Charles Prolsch was involved in the Baptism of Rebecca G. Howard, a prominent African American restaurateur and hotelier.

In his book, Prosch wrote about moving to the west coast from New York and staying in San Francisco before being lured to Steilacoom for a publishing job.

The Washington State Historical Society has a photograph of him.
