= Charles W. Slocum =

Pioneer businessman in Pacific Northwest (1835–1912)

- Born: Charles Wilbur Slocum; June 19, 1835; New Bedford, Massachusetts, United States
- Died: September 21, 1912 (aged 77); Vancouver, Washington, United States
- Occupations: Businessman, carpenter

Charles W. Slocum (June 19, 1835 – September 21, 1912) was an American pioneer businessman active in the Pacific Northwest.

== Early life ==
Charles Wilbur Slocum was born in New Bedford, Massachusetts, on June 19, 1835. In his youth, his family moved to Providence, Rhode Island, to be with other family members. Slocum learned the trade of carpentry from his uncle, becoming a master carpenter. In 1857, Charles Slocum and his cousin William C. Hazard decided to seek their fortunes in the Western United States. They took a steamer to Panama, crossed the Isthmus, and then took the steamer "Golden Gate" north to San Francisco. By the end of 1858, the two cousins had gone further north to Vancouver, Washington Territory. Slocum got a job with the government at Fort Vancouver, doing carpentry work. Within three years, he was the superintendent at the Fort, responsible for building and maintenance.

== Business career ==
While working at Fort Vancouver, Slocum started a general merchandise store in downtown Vancouver, Washington Territory. Soon he formed a partnership for the store with James Crawford, calling the firm Crawford & Slocum Company. The business included importing and exporting goods such as lumber using the nearby Columbia River. Soon the business expanded with another store to the east, in Walla Walla, Washington Territory. When gold was discovered at Orofino, near Lewiston, in what is now Idaho, Crawford & Slocum set up a merchandise store for the miners in 1862. They also had their store in Walla Walla, Washington Territory, to the west of Lewiston. It was more profitable to supply the miners than to do the mining themselves. In 1863, Slocum went to the Boise Valley in Idaho, where another gold strike had occurred. With the help of two army officers, he is credited with platting the city of Boise, Idaho Territory. Crawford & Slocum were among the first businesses in this city, with an additional merchandise store being opened. The merchandise stores also offered a form of banking, providing safekeeping of valuables for individuals and other businesses, and offering business and agricultural loans.

From 1860 to 1869, Slocum had numerous contracts with the government to provide supplies. He was involved in short and long range shipping, utilizing ten teams of mules, thirty mules to a team, to transport goods to various parts of the Northwest, including Walla Walla, Camp Lyon, Camp Three Forks, Camp Alvord, and Salt Lake City. He received freight from San Francisco and Portland, took the freight by boat up the Columbia River to Umattila, Oregon Territory, and from there hauled by mule team to Lewiston and Boise. In each of the locations where Crawford & Slocum had a store, Slocum used his carpentry and construction knowledge to build prominent building for the stores, as well as housing when one of the partners was in town. The store in Boise was later bought by Mayor Thomas E. Logan, who converted it to a house. The house still remains as one of Boise's early adobe period houses. In 1869, Slocum sold his businesses, with the exception of the store in Vancouver, Washington Territory. He personally then focused on managing the Vancouver store, his other business interests, and his civic and social activities.

== Family and social life ==
Charles Slocum married Laura R. Riggs in 1861. Laura's family had traveled west by covered wagon, spending seven months on the trail before reaching Portland, Oregon. The Riggs family settled in Washougal, Washington which was to the east of Vancouver on the Columbia River. The Slocums built a house in Washougal, Washington Territory, overlooking the Columbia River. This house served as a summer home in Washington. After returning to Vancouver, Washington Territory in 1869, Slocum became interested in building a mansion in the vicinity of downtown Vancouver. The foundation was laid in May, 1877, further progress despite "its large dimensions, and the substantial character of the materials and work" was reported in late June, 1877, and work was completed by the beginning of 1878. The house is described by one writer as "a beautiful house of distinctive New England style architecture with a distinctive, roof top widow's walk next to the octagonal cupola. The house’s ornate scrollwork makes this building outstanding. A fan light sits above the large, double front doors."

Slocum House originally stood at 404 W. 5th. The house was moved in 1966 to the southwest corner of Esther Short Park, in Vancouver, Washington, to save it from destruction. The Slocum House became the center of early Vancouver society. The progress of the building, from foundation to structure, was regularly reported on by the local newspaper, the Vancouver Independent. When completed and unveiled to society on New Year's Day in 1878, the local paper described it as follows:

Mr. and Mrs. Charles Slocum received their friends at their elegant new home on New Year’s day. They have now finished and nearly furnished one of the handsomest residences in Washington Territory. For completeness, neatness, convenience, and architectural beauty, it discounts any house we know of in the country. Their friends are glad to see them so agreeably situated.

The Slocum House is listed in the National Register of Historic Places, based on its architectural value to the State of Washington.

Charles and Laura were active members of St. Luke's Episcopal Church (Vancouver, Washington), with Charles serving on the Vestry in 1870. Charles Slocum's long-time partner, James Crawford was married to Mary McCarty, the daughter of Rev.John D. McCarty, the first rector of St. Luke's .

Charles W. Slocum died on September 21, 1912, in Vancouver, Washington. He is buried in the Old Cemetery in Vancouver, Washington.

== See also ==
- National Register of Historic Places listings in Clark County, Washington
