= Joseph T. Dickman =

United States Army general in World War I

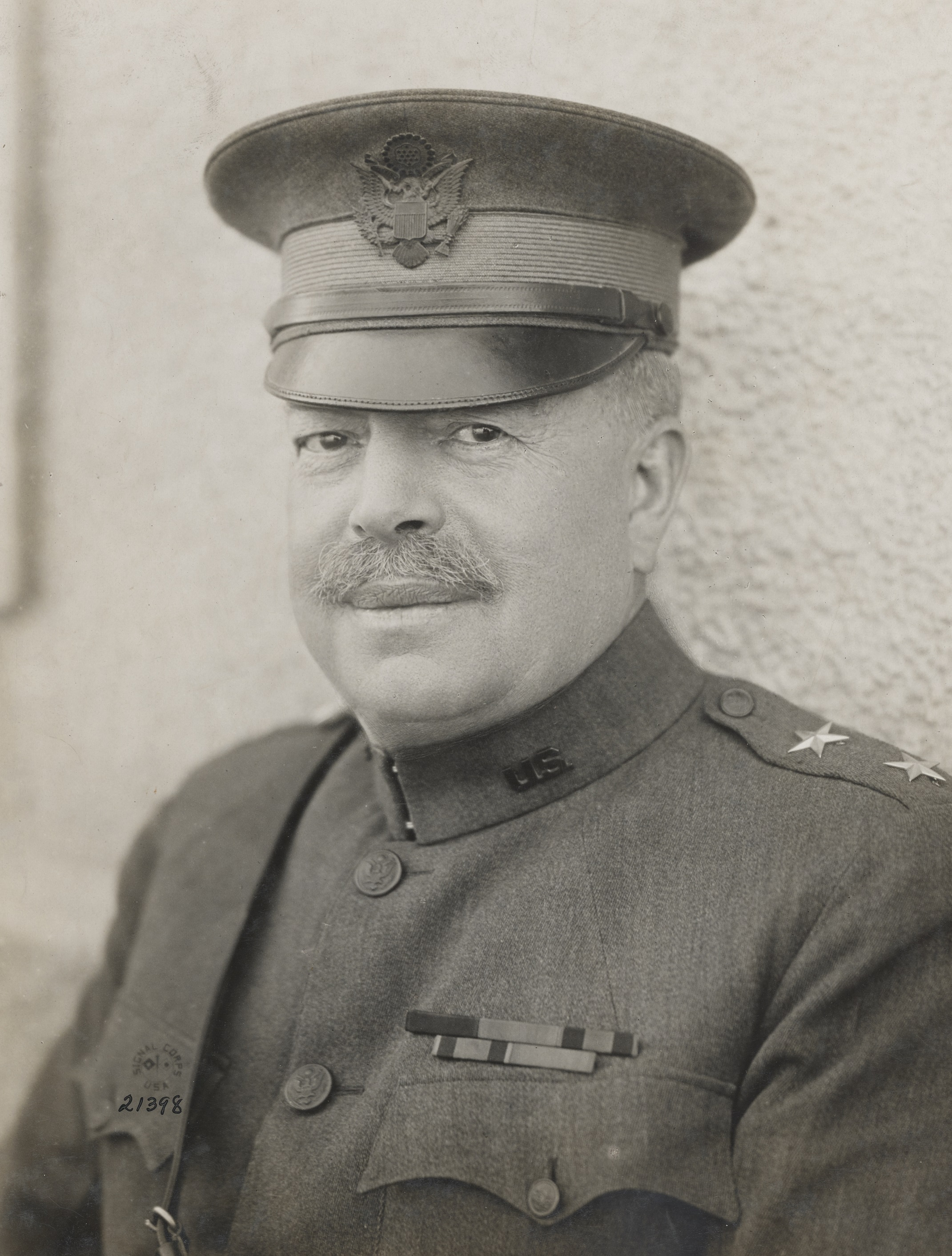
- Major General Joseph T. Dickman in October 1918
- Born: October 6, 1857; Dayton, Ohio, U.S.
- Died: October 23, 1927 (aged 70); Washington, D.C., U.S.
- Burial place: Arlington National Cemetery
- Military career
- Allegiance: United States
- Branch: United States Army
- Service years: 1883–1922
- Rank: Major General
- Service number: 0-17
- Commands: Third Army; I Corps; IV Corps; 3rd Division; 85th Division; 2nd Cavalry Regiment
- Conflicts: Apache Wars: Geronimo Campaign; Spanish–American War: Battle of San Juan Hill; Philippine–American War: Battle of Panay; Boxer Rebellion: Battle of Pa-ta-Chao; World War I: Battle of Chateau-Thierry; Second Battle of the Marne; Battle of Saint-Mihiel; Battle of the Argonne Forest
- Awards: Army Distinguished Service Medal; Commander of the Legion of Honour (France); Croix de Guerre (France); Grand Officer of the Order of Leopold (Belgium); Grand Officer of the Order of the Crown of Italy; Knight Commander of the Order of the Bath (United Kingdom); Medal of Solidarity (Panama)
- Other work: Memoirs (1927); Translated General Von der Goltz's "Conduct of War"

Joseph Theodore Dickman (October 6, 1857 – October 23, 1927) was a United States Army officer who saw service in five wars, rising to the rank of major general.

== Early life ==
Dickman was born in Dayton, Ohio. He was the son of Theodore Dickman, who served as a first lieutenant in the 58th Ohio Infantry during the American Civil War. He attended the University of Dayton and graduated in the class of 1871. In 1881 he graduated 27th in a class of 53 from the United States Military Academy at West Point and was commissioned in the 3rd Cavalry. Among his classmates were several men who would attain the rank of general officer, such as John Frank Morrison, Francis Joseph Kernan, Enoch Crowder, Edwin St. John Greble, Charles H. Barth, Clarence Page Townsley, Charles L. Phillips, George True Bartlett, Joseph Alfred Gaston, Henry Clay Hodges Jr. and John Biddle.

== Military career ==
=== Apache Wars and Border Duty 1883–1898 ===
Dickman graduated from the United States Army Cavalry School in 1883 and proceeded directly to the Indian territory, where he participated in the Apache War from 1885 to 1886, to include the Geronimo Campaign. He next participated in the Mexican border patrol operations during the Garza Revolution against Garza revolutionists and the bandits, Benavides and Gonzales.

Dickman's early experience sent him to Fort Riley, where he was an instructor at the Cavalry and Light Artillery School from 1893 to 1894. He deployed to the Pullman Strike in Chicago 1894. Later that year, he was assigned to Fort Ethan Allen, Vermont.

=== Spanish–American War, 1898–1900 ===
Dickman's deployment during the Spanish–American War was notable. He participated in the Battle of San Juan Hill-El Caney, Santiago de Cuba. He served on the staff of General Joseph Wheeler during the Philippine–American War from 1899 to 1902 and at the Battles on the Island of Panay from 1899 to 1900.

=== Boxer Rebellion, 1900 ===
During the Boxer Rebellion, Dickman was chief of staff to General Adna R. Chaffee for the Peking Relief Expedition and fought in the battle at Pa-ta-Chao, Peking on September 26, 1900.

=== 1902–1917 ===
Dickman was on the Army General Staff from 1902 to 1905. He was an instructor at the Army War College from 1905 to 1912. Dickman was the US Army Inspector General from 1912 to 1915, taking over 2nd US Cavalry in 1915.

=== World War I, 1917–1918 ===
He was given command of the 85th Infantry Division, at Camp Custer, Michigan, in August 1917, four months after the American entry into World War I.

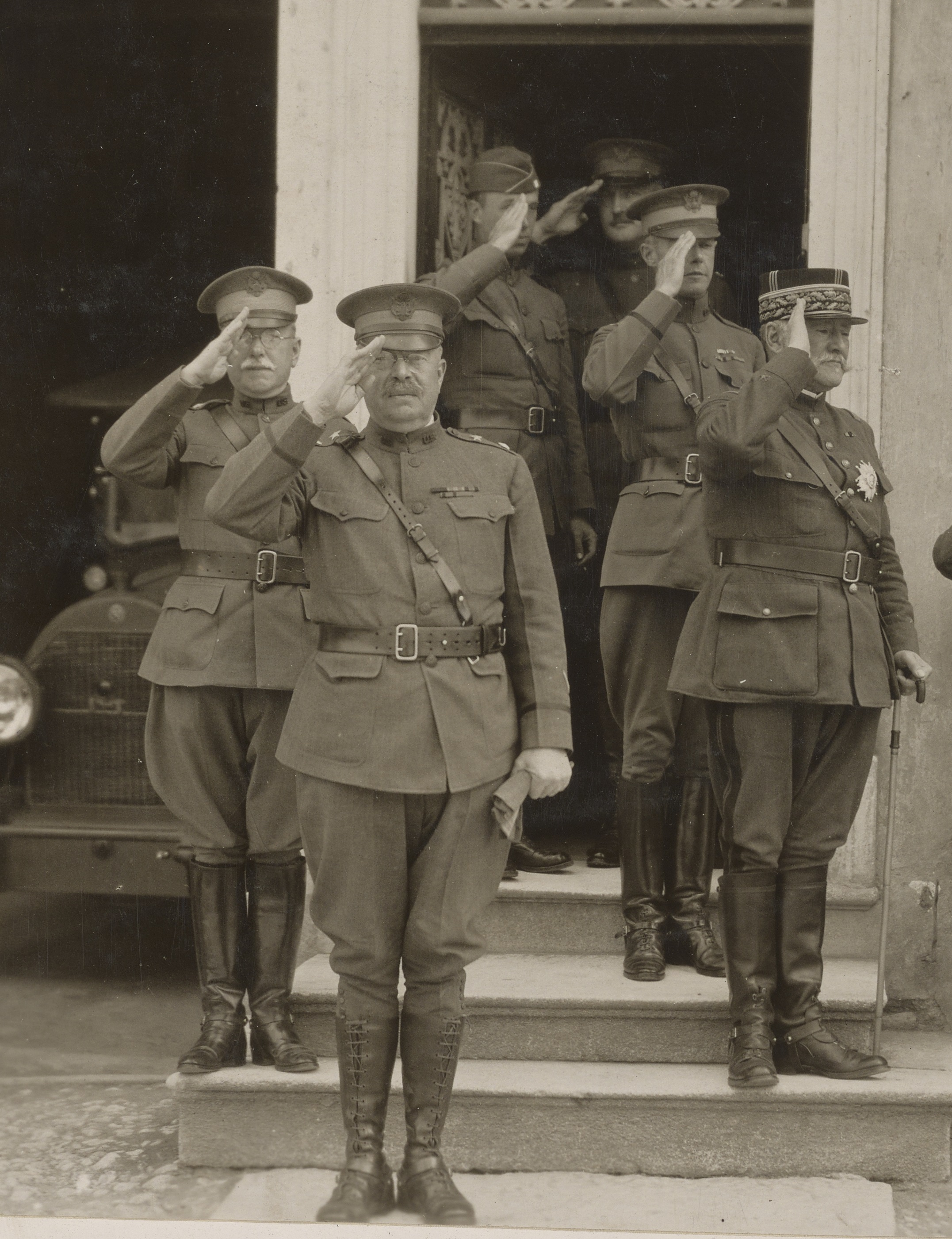
Dickman (center), CG IV Corps, with generals Frank L. Winn (left), CG 89th division, and Augustin Gérard (right), CG 8th army in Lucey August 1918.

Dickman was then given command of the 3rd Infantry Division in November 1917. He deployed the 3rd Division to France aboard the Leviathan at noon, on March 4, 1918. He was the 3rd Division commander at Chateau-Thierry in May 1918 and was made famous at the Second Battle of the Marne in July 1918. While allied forces on both flanks retreated, the 3rd Division stood fast in the face of enemy offensives, which led to their moniker, "The Rock of the Marne."

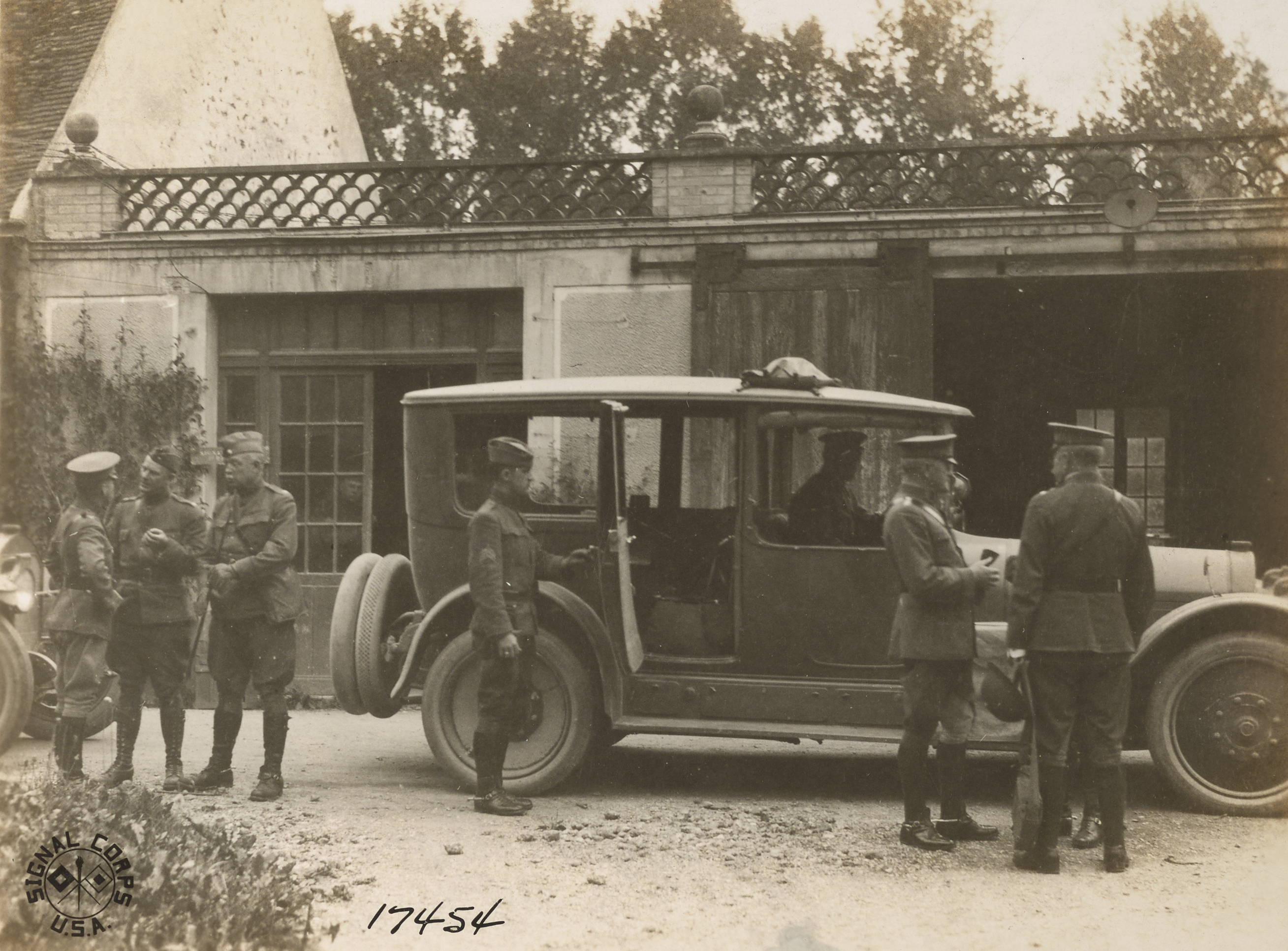
General John J. Pershing, C-in-C of the AEF, conversing with Major General Joseph T. Dickman, commanding the 3rd Division, and members of his staff at Dickman's division headquarters, France, July 1918.

Dickman commanded IV Corps from August to September 1918, to include the Saint-Mihiel Offensive in September 1918. He then commanded I Corps from October to November 1918, to include the Meuse–Argonne offensive.

The Third Army was established under the command of Dickman by General John J. Pershing in France to advance to the Rhein and hold the Coblenz bridgehead, then prepare to serve after the war as the Army of Occupation of the Rhineland. The Third Army would have become the Army of Occupation whether or not the enemy signed the peace agreement. American fighting units not sent home were consolidated under Third Army and prepared to attack if Germany did not accept the terms of peace. The United States itself was not to sign the agreement but remained technically at war with Germany for two more years.

For his services during the war he was awarded the Army Distinguished Service Medal, the citation for which reads:

The President of the United States of America, authorized by Act of Congress, July 9, 1918, takes pleasure in presenting the Army Distinguished Service Medal to Major General Joseph Theodore Dickman, United States Army, for exceptionally meritorious and distinguished services to the Government of the United States, in a duty of great responsibility during World War I, as Commander of the 3d Army, American Expeditionary Forces. General Dickman commanded the 3d Division and contributed in large measure to success in hurling back the final enemy general attack commencing 14 July 1918. He participated in the offensive operations northward to Vesle River; commanded the 4th Army Corps from 18 August to 11 October 1918, including the operation of the reduction of the St. Mihiel salient, and the 1st Army Corps during the Meuse-Argonne operations from 12 October until after the armistice. Later he commanded the 3d Army of Occupation at Coblenz, Germany.

=== Post war ===
Dickman returned from World War I to serve as president of the Tactics and Organization Board, which reported on lessons learned during the war from April–July 1919. Dickman served as commanding general of the VIII Corps Area from 1919 to 1921. He retired on October 6, 1921. He was later recalled to preside over postwar-army downsizing board in 1922. His memoirs were published in 1927.

General Dickman was a hereditary member of the Kansas Commandery of the Military Order of the Loyal Legion of the United States, by right of his father's service as an officer in the Union Army.

Dickman died in Washington, D.C., on October 23, 1927. He was buried in Arlington National Cemetery.

== Dates of rank ==
Second Lieut., 3d Cavalry, June 11, 1881
First Lieut., 3d Cavalry, Jan. 18, 1886
Captain of Cavalry, 8th Cavalry, May 27, 1898
Major, 26th U. S. Volunteer Infantry, July 5, 1899
Lieut.‑Colonel, 26th U. S. Volunteer Infantry, Sept. 13, 1899
Major 13th Cavalry, March 7, 1906
Lieut.‑Colonel of Cavalry, Feb. 29, 1912
Colonel of Cavalry, Dec. 14, 1914
Brigadier-General, U. S. A., May 15, 1917
Major-General, National Army, Aug. 5, 1917
Major-General, Jan. 9, 1919
Vacated commission as major-general, National Army, Only, Jan. 7, 1920
Major-General, U. S. A., Retired, Oct. 6, 1921, By Operation of Law.

== Awards and decorations ==
American awards

Army Distinguished Service Medal
Indian Campaign Medal (Geronimo Campaign), 1885
Spanish Campaign Medal, 1898
Army of Cuban Occupation Medal, 1899
Philippine Campaign Medal, 1899
China Campaign Medal, 1900
Mexican Border Service Medal, 1916
World War I Victory Medal (United States), 1919 (with six clasps)

Foreign awards

Croix de Guerre with palm (France), 1918
Grand Officer of the Order of Leopold I (Belgium), 1919
Knight Commander of the Order of the Bath (Britain), 1919
Commander of the Order of the Legion of Honour (France), 1919
Grand Officer of the Order of the Crown (Italy), 1919
Medal of Solidarity (Panama)

The honorary degree of LL.D. was conferred on him by the University of Vermont.

== Historical footnotes ==
=== USS Joseph T. Dickman ===
The USS Joseph T. Dickman (APA-13) and the USS Hunter Liggett (APA-14), along with the USS Leonard Wood (APA-12), were the largest attack transports in the Amphibian Force during World War II. They each carried 35 landing boats and 2 tank lighters, along with 51 officers and a crew of 634. These newly commissioned U.S. Navy vessels were operated by the US Coast Guard. The USS Joseph T. Dickman carried soldiers of the 4th Infantry to the beaches of Normandy during Operation Overlord on D-Day.

=== The Dickman Rifles ===
The famous National Society of Pershing Rifles had its origin in 1894, when future general John J. "Black Jack" Pershing, then a second lieutenant in charge of military instruction at the University of Nebraska, started a "Varsity Rifles" drill team. A year later the unit was recognized as a fraternity and took on the formal name of "Pershing Rifles."

Similarly, the Dickman Rifles was an honorary military society formed at the University of Dayton to honor Maj. Gen. Joseph T. Dickman, Class of 1871. In May 1931 the Dickman Rifles were invited to a Pershing Rifles drill competition. This exposure to the National Society of Pershing Rifles led to a petition from the members to join the National Society.

== Published works ==
- Dickman, Joseph Theodore. The Great Crusade. A Narrative of the World War. NY: Appleton, 1927. An account of his war experiences.
- Lieutenant, 3rd Cavalry. "Balloons in War." Cavalry Journal. 10: June 1897, 103–12.
- Major, inspector general. "Cavalry Organization." Cavalry Journal. 22: January 1912, 650–56.
- Lieutenant, 3rd Cavalry. "Dickman Field Holder (R)" Cavalry Journal. 10: March 1897, 80–82.
- Captain, 8th U.S. Cavalry. "Experiences in China." Cavalry Journal. 13: July 1902, 5–40.
- Lieutenant, 3rd Cavalry. "Field Exercise at Fort Leavenworth." Cavalry Journal. 10: June 1897, 158–66.
- Captain, 8th Cavalry. "General Service and Staff College, Fort Leavenworth." Cavalry Journal. 13: October 1902, 217–31.
- Major General, USA (Ret). "Great Crusade (R)." Cavalry Journal. 36: April 1927, 328.
- "Has the Buffalo a Sense of Humor?" Cavalry Journal. 35: April 1926, 216.
- Major. "Marching Cavalry in Rolling Country." Cavalry Journal. 18: April 1908, 703–08.
- Lieutenant, 3rd Cavalry. "Military Policy and Institutions." Cavalry Journal. 10: December 1897, 383–96.
- First Lieutenant, 3rd Cavalry. "New Method of Loading the Revolver." Cavalry Journal. 7: June 1894, 178–79.
- "Outline Descriptions of the Horse." Cavalry Journal. 10: March 1897, 40–44.
- "Patrol Duty." Cavalry Journal. 11: March 1898, 102–44.
- Maj. Gen., CG Third Army, A.E.F. "Plea for the Saber." Cavalry Journal. 29: October 1920, 251–53.
- "Word to the Cavalry (by Captain Ludwig Drees)." Cavalry Journal. 29: April 1920, 93–96.
- Dickman, Joseph T. (intro.) History of the Third Division United States Army in the World War. Andernach-On-The-Rhine, 1919. 397 p.
- Dickman, J.T. et al. The Santiago Campaign. Richmond, VA: Williams, 1927. 442 p.
- Dupuy, Trevor N., et al. The Harper Encyclopedia of Military Biography. NY: HarperCollins Publishers, Inc., 1992. p. 219.
- General Orders No. 17, War Department, 1927. Summarizes his career.
- Pitt, Barrie. 1918: The Last Act. New York, 1963.

=== Translations ===
- General Von der Goltz's "Conduct of War."

== Bibliography ==
- Bullard, Robert Lee (2013). Fighting Generals: Illustrated Biographical Sketches of Seven Major Generals in World War I. Literary Licensing. ISBN 9781258861193.
- Davis, Henry Blaine Jr. (1998). Generals in Khaki. Raleigh, NC: Pentland Press. ISBN 1571970886. OCLC 40298151.
- Venzon, Anne Cipriano (2013). The United States in the First World War: an Encyclopedia. Hoboken, NJ: Taylor and Francis. ISBN 978-1-135-68453-2. OCLC 865332376.
- Zabecki, David T.; Mastriano, Douglas V., eds. (2020). Pershing's Lieutenants: American Military Leadership in World War I. New York, NY: Osprey Publishing. ISBN 978-1-4728-3863-6.

== Notes ==
Military offices
New command	Commander 3d Infantry Division; 1917–1918	Succeeded by James Anderson Irons
Preceded by Hunter Liggett	Commander I Corps; October – November 1918	Succeeded by Hunter Liggett
New command	Commander Third Army; 1918–1919	Succeeded by Hunter Liggett
