= St. Luke's Episcopal Church (Vancouver, Washington) =

Coordinates: 45°38′25″N 122°40′04″W

St. Luke's Episcopal Church (Vancouver, Washington) is a parish of the Episcopal Church of America located in Vancouver, Washington. The parish is part of the Episcopal Diocese of Olympia and traces its roots to the initial arrival of Anglican worshippers at Fort Vancouver in the Oregon Country in the 1830s; its first dedicated church building was consecrated in 1860.

== History ==
=== Pre-parish ===
Services were periodically conducted by Anglican officers at Fort Vancouver. Fort Vancouver was established as the main center for trading by the Hudson's Bay Company (HBC) and was located north of the Columbia River. John McLoughlin, factor of Fort Vancouver, and a Catholic, asked HBC for a full-time minister. HBC sent Reverend Beaver, an Anglican priest in 1836. Reverend Beaver's attitudes conflicted with McLoughlin's and others at the Fort. He did not like the worship being conducted in a schoolhouse, nor his quarters, nor the marriages of the existing officers of Fort Vancouver. He also complained about his allotment of alcohol being too small. In 1838 Reverend Beaver returned to England.

=== Early parish ===
In 1849, after the Treaty of Oregon established Fort Vancouver as being in United States territories, U.S. troops arrived. In 1853, Rev. John D. McCarty, a former chaplain for the troops was called to establish the first Episcopal Church in the Oregon Territory, Trinity Church (now Trinity Cathedral) in Portland Rev. McCarty quickly began to serve both Trinity and Fort Vancouver and would work part of the week at Trinity, then cross the Columbia River (often a tricky proposition) to serve the remainder of the week at Fort Vancouver

The first church building for St. Luke's was a converted schoolhouse near the fort. While he had been conducting services in the village since coming to Fort Vancouver, Reverend McCarty started regular services in this schoolhouse in 1857. On May 27, 1860, Whitsunday, the church was consecrated by Bishop Thomas Fielding Scott, becoming the first Episcopal Church in the Territory of Washington. Participating as founders of the church were John D. McCarty, John Eddings, Colonel Henry C. Hodges Jr., Louis Sohns, James Crawford, H. G. Struve, James Davison, Joseph K. Barnes, Benjamin Alvord (mathematician), and others. On February 21, 1868, St. Luke's was incorporated in Washington Territory.

On March 2, 1873, a new church with a prominent 119 foot high steeple seen throughout Vancouver, was used for the first time. The church was stated to be "one of the landmarks of the city and one of the first objects to greet the gaze of the approaching visitor as he comes across the river." The church also included parish buildings and a rectory. St. Luke's, under the guidance of its second rector, Reverend Albert S. Nicholson, started a parish school. The St. Luke's Parish School, with Miss A. Loomis as principal, and Mrs. M. Nicholson as a teacher of music, provided instruction in letters, arts, and music to both girls and boys.

On August 24, 1881, the first convocation of the Protestant Episcopal Church of the Missionary Jurisdiction of Washington was held at St. Luke's Church in Vancouver, Washington Territory. This annual meeting was also held there in 1882 and 1883. In the early 1890s St. Luke's also promoted and participated, through its rector Reverend Mardon D. Wilson (who was also the Secretary of the Missionary Jurisdiction of Washington Territory), in the creation of the Episcopal Diocese of Olympia in 1910.

=== Twentieth century ===
On Sunday, December 6, 1931, only one-half hour after the close of the morning service, the Rector, Dr. Coleman Byram, his wife, and James O'Banion were having a meal in the rectory. Dr. Byram smelled smoke and they all saw that the church was on fire. Mrs. Byram called the Fire Department, and Fr. Byram and James raced frantically into the church to save as much as they could. Later helped by others from the neighborhood as well as the firemen, they were able to save the vestments, brass works, some hymnals, and the symbolic bishop's chair. The fire was so great that it sent embers throughout the neighborhood, and was visible throughout the city. All was destroyed, but the rectory was saved. St. Luke's directly took on the responsibility of establishing other Episcopal parishes throughout Clark County, Washington. On March 18, 1951, St. Anne's Mission, Camas-Washougal, had its first service. St. Luke's clergy and leadership contributed significantly to the organization and provisioning of the church. The Diocese of Olympia and St. Luke's agreed to jointly share the expense of the vicar, and land was purchased for a new church facility

Late in 1957, the parish purchased land east of St. Luke's, midway between St. Luke's and St. Anne's. This was to become The Church of the Good Shepherd Mission. The land was purchased in advance of the anticipated expansion of Vancouver to the east. The Parochial Mission was dedicated by the Rt. Reverend Stephen Bayne in January 1968 and The Church of the Good Shepherd became a Diocesan Mission on July 1, 1976, sharing the vicar on a half-time basis with St. Anne's Mission. On June 19, 1978, St. Luke's deeded over the land to Good Shepherd.

In 1960, St. Hubert's of the Hills Mission at Yacolt, Washington was started by St. Luke's. This was the first Episcopal service held in the northeast part of Clark County. While a lot in town was donated and a small building erected, the mission could not sustain itself. In November 1969, the lot was sold with the proceeds going to another mission's development, All Saints Episcopal Mission in Hazel Dell.

The concept for a mission in Hazel Dell, an area to the north of St. Luke's, was initiated in 1959. In 1966, the land was purchased by the diocese and St. Luke's. On September 17, 1978, the first service of the Episcopal church's newest congregation was conducted in a local school. The building site was blessed by Bishop Cochrane in 1981.

In 1999 the diocese designated St. Luke's to be one of its multi-diversity parishes, in recognition of the new population arriving in Vancouver. St. Luke's became also known as St. Luke's ~ San Lucas as a result of this.

Two other activities marked St. Luke's in the twentieth century. First was the music program. While music had been a popular part of services at St. Luke's from the beginning, it moved to a new level with the arrival of Stella Baird in 1925. A skilled musician and educator, Mrs. Baird became the organist and choir director in 1925, and held those roles for the next twenty-eight years. Initially drawing from outside the church, she built an adult choir and two youth choirs. These were popular in the community, with Vancouver Barracks officers and families joining in, among them General George Marshall. At Vespers in 1942, the combined chorus during the service counted over 72 members.

Another annual event, started in 1948, was the St. Luke's Antique Show and Sale. On November 9, the Show was opened by Mayor Vern Anderson, who used the historical Hudson's Bay Company key, all bedecked with ribbons for the occasion. The Ladies Guild dressed in old costumes, special exhibits were set up, and the event saw over 1,000 attendees, most from outside of the area. The Antique Show became an institution in Vancouver, carried on for many years, and raising money for a camp at Spirit Lake, Mt. St. Helens, parish improvements, local charities, and many other worthy endeavors.

== Notable early members ==
- John D. McCarty – missionary priest, chaplain, first rector of St. Luke's
- Albert S. Nicholson – educator, second rector of St. Luke's, Superintendent of Schools
- Joseph M. Fletcher – attorney, land agent, first senior warden at St. Luke's, civic leader, Mayor of Vancouver
- John McNeil Eddings – businessman, pioneer postmaster in Clark County WA
- Henry G. Struve – attorney, judge, newspaper editor, Mayor of Seattle, university regent
- Louis Sohns – Mayor of Vancouver, businessman, legislator, banker, railroad owner
- W. Byron Daniels - Mayor of Vancouver, lawyer, city attorney, Superintendent of Schools
- Lloyd W. DuBois – businessman, pioneer in Clark County WA
- Jacob Proebstel – businessman, farmer, pioneer in Clark County WA, farmer
- Henry Weinhard - businessman, brewer in Vancouver WA, then in Portland OR
- Charles W. Slocum – businessman, pioneer in Clark County WA
- George Marshall – general, U.S. Army, Secretary of Defense, diplomat, Nobel Peace Prize recipient
- Henry C. Hodges – brigadier general, U.S. Army, Civil War quartermaster
- Oliver O. Howard – major general, U.S. Army, university founder, author, Medal of Honor recipient
- Joseph K. Barnes – surgeon, Surgeon General of the United States Army
- G. B. Dandy – brigadier general, U.S. Army
- W. H. Johnston – brigadier general, U.S. Army
- Benjamin Alvord (mathematician) – brigadier general, U.S. Army, mathematician, botanist
- Charles G. Sawtelle – brigadier general, U. S. Army, Quartermaster General
- Owen Summers Jr. – brigadier general, U.S. Army
- William Dorsey Pender – major general, C.S. A. Army

== Buildings, art, and music ==
=== Buildings ===
While St. Luke's has a long history in the Northwest, that history has been made more by the people attending the church than the structures they occupied. However, the buildings have been both typical and significant to the local area.

The current church is actually the fourth such building for St. Luke's. The first church was a converted schoolhouse, taken over in 1857, and located just outside Fort Vancouver. Although relatively small, the church building was reshaped to attract military leaders and their families as well as local civic leaders and pioneers.

A new church was built in 1873, located more in the center of the city of Vancouver. The church was built of cedar, a vaulted sanctuary. The steeple, which was over 119 feet tall, was one of the most prominent features of the city, viewable by those arriving from the Columbia River. An 1,125 pound bell was added to the belfry in 1882, and stained glass windows as a memorial to the Robert F. Kidwell, step son of Joseph M. Fletcher, in 1876, as well as other memorial windows. This is the building that was destroyed in 1931 by a fire, which also destroyed its altar, bell, stained glass windows, and other memorials.

A new church building was built in 1932, more of brick than wood, and relocated to the north of downtown. The new architecture expressed a more solid tower and carpenter gothic style, and faced north–south. A parish house was added in 1942 and in 1956 an educational wing was added.

The fourth church of St. Luke's was a modification of the earlier church, with parts of that church's structure (bell tower, chapel) incorporated, and the Sanctuary enlarged and faced east–west. This church was dedicated in 1959. This current structure has dramatically vaulted ceilings in the Sanctuary, capped by a choir loft at the west end and a simple altar and cross at the east end. Part of the predecessor church building was retained and converted into a memorial chapel.

=== Art ===
The current church contains 27 stained glass windows that are considered artistically significant. Eight windows were added in the early 1940s to the third church building, and later moved into what is now a side chapel of the main Sanctuary. The artist or artists are not known, but the quality of these traditional-style stained glass windows is considerable. They depict the Life of Jesus Christ, utilizing a detailed style of painting on glass, and contain many religious symbols pertinent to their particular window.

The main Sanctuary has a large stained glass window depicting St. Luke, which was created by Gabriel Loire and installed in 1967. Gabriel Loire was a world renown glass artist, with installations in over 800 places around the world. Some of his earliest pieces in the Northwest, following the dalle de verre style, were installed in St. Luke's in 1957. St. Luke's has 16 windows by Gabriel Loire, as well as 7 by his son Jacques Loire. The windows often utilize rich shades of blue, which the artist felt expressed peace. The faceting on the glass produces a wonderful experience for the viewer from within the church building, particularly as the viewer is surrounded by these windows.

=== Music ===
Music has always been a pleasure and active pursuit at St. Luke's, from early choir groups to community musical events. Contributing to this is the good acoustics of the current Sanctuary, as well as its musical instruments. In the choir loft, below a rose window by Gabriel Loire, is a pipe organ built in 1890 by W. K. Adams. The organ is highly versatile and musical - one of the best examples of historic American organ building in the Northwest. It is a special and rare instrument because of its long history, and because it utilizes mechanical ("tracker") action to control the pipes. This sort of action is the most sensitive and most reliable way to build an organ

The church also has a Sohmer & Co. grand piano that was built in 1924 and purchased in 1989 as a memorial to Dr. James O'Banion. The O'Banions were part of the St. Luke's family for decades. On December 6, 1931, Jim, then a 13-year-old acolyte at St. Luke's, happened to be on hand when fire broke out in our second building at 8th and C Streets.

The Mason and Hamlin Melodeon (reed organ) was probably built in 1868, and was played in St. Luke's first building by Kate Fauble Hardin. When a new building was built in 1871, a new organ was also purchased, and the Melodeon was given to Miss Fauble. It passed to her nephew, Mr. Richard Fauble, who donated it back to the church in 1992.

A set of 37 Petit & Fritsen handbells was made in the Netherlands. Dutch bells have a richer, more complex tone color than American handbells common in this country – more like a tower carillon. Generous donations made it possible for St. Luke's to purchase them, and they were blessed on Pentecost Sunday, 2006. They are played frequently in worship by the Handbell Choir.
