= John Frank Morrison =

American general

John F. Morrison
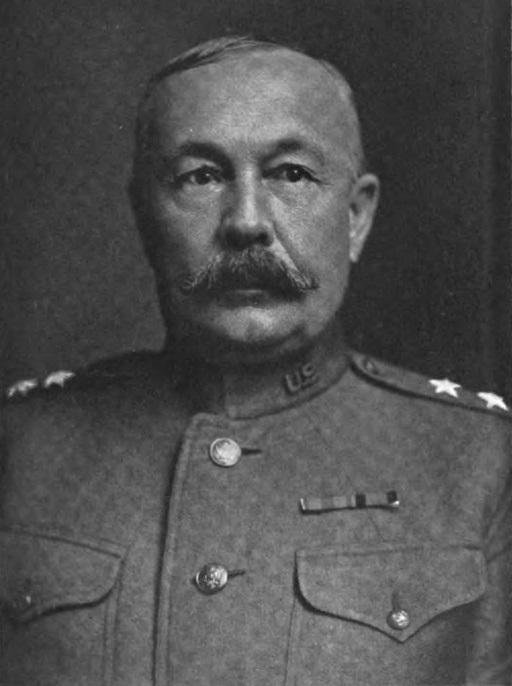
- From Volume XXIII (1933) of The National Cyclopaedia of American Biography.
- Born: December 20, 1857; Charlotteville, New York, United States
- Died: October 22, 1932 (aged 74); Washington, D.C., United States
- Burial place: Arlington National Cemetery, Virginia, United States
- Spouse: Kate L. McCleery (m. 1887–1929, her death)
- Military career
- Allegiance: United States
- Branch: United States Army
- Service years: 1881–1921
- Rank: Major General
- Service number: 0-4
- Unit: Infantry Branch
- Commands: 6th Infantry Regiment; 15th Infantry Regiment; United States Forces in China; Fort Oglethorpe, Georgia; 30th Division; 8th Division; Western Department; Camp Lewis, Washington; Southeastern Department; Fourth Corps Area
- Conflicts: Spanish–American War; Philippine–American War; Pancho Villa Expedition; World War I
- Awards: Army Distinguished Service Medal; Silver Star

Major General John Frank Morrison (December 20, 1857 – October 22, 1932) was a career officer in the United States Army. A veteran of the Spanish–American War, Philippine–American War, Pancho Villa Expedition, and World War I, he attained the rank of major general and was a recipient of the Army Distinguished Service Medal and Silver Star.

== Early life and education ==
John F. Morrison (Note: Morrison's middle name appears in records as Franklin, Frank, and Francis. Frank was used most often.) was born in Charlotteville, Schoharie County, New York on December 20, 1857, the son of Hannah (Lamont) Morrison and John Morrison, who served as county clerk. He graduated from Schoharie Academy, then began attendance at the United States Military Academy (USMA) at West Point, New York, from which he graduated in 1881, ranked 26th in a class of 53. Among his classmates were several men who would later attain the rank of brigadier general or higher in their military careers, such as John Biddle, Harry F. Hodges, Edwin St. John Greble, George T. Bartlett, Charles L. Phillips, Clarence P. Townsley, Joseph A. Gaston, Guy Carleton, Francis J. Kernan, Harry C. Hodges Jr., Joseph T. Dickman, James T. Kerr, Enoch Crowder, Charles H. Barth, Lyman W. V. Kennon and John B. McDonald.

Upon his graduation, Morrison was commissioned as a second lieutenant of Infantry.

== Start of career ==
Morrison was assigned to the 20th Infantry Regiment and served briefly at Fort Brown, Texas. In November 1881 he was assigned Fort Wallace, Kansas. In November 1882 he was transferred to Fort Supply, Indian Territory. From June to August 1883 he was on duty at the Fort Leavenworth Military Prison in Kansas. Morrison was then assigned as a student at the Fort Leavenworth Infantry and Cavalry School of Application from which he graduated in July 1885. He performed frontier duty at Fort Assinniboine, Montana from July 1885 to July 1887.

From July 1887 to September 1893, Morrison was professor of military science and tactics and Kansas State Agricultural College in Manhattan, Kansas. In November 1890 he was assigned to the 1st Infantry Regiment and promoted to first lieutenant. In July 1891 he was transferred back to the 20th Infantry. From September 1893 to March 1897, Morrison was assigned as quartermaster of the 20th Infantry Regiment. From March 1897 to April 1898, he was an instructor at the Infantry and Cavalry School. In April 1898 he was promoted to captain.

== Spanish–American War ==
After his promotion to captain, Morrison rejoined the 20th Infantry Regiment, which traveled to Mobile, Alabama in preparation for deployment to Cuba during the Spanish–American War. He served in Cuba throughout the war, including the Siege of Santiago. Morrison received the Citation Star for gallantry during the Battle of El Caney. When the Silver Star award was created in 1918, Morrison's citation star was converted to the new medal.

He returned to Fort Leavenworth in January 1899. In February, the 20th Infantry departed the United States for service in the Philippine–American War. Morrison remained in the Philippines until March 1904, and served as regimental quartermaster again from November 1899 to June 1901.

== Continued career ==
During the Russo-Japanese War, Morrison served as a military attaché in Japan from March to November 1904. He was then selected for attendance at the United States Army War College, from which he graduated in 1906. He was promoted to major in October 1905. From September 1906 to August 1907, Morrison was an instructor at the Army Staff College and Army School of the Line. From August 1907 to July 1911, he served as assistant commandant of the Army Service Schools, and was the school's acting commandant on several occasions. In June 1911, Morrison received promotion to lieutenant colonel.

After his promotion to lieutenant colonel, Morrison served with the 20th Infantry at Vancouver Barracks, Washington. In September 1914, he was promoted to colonel and assigned to command the 6th Infantry Regiment, which he led during service on the Mexico–United States border during the Pancho Villa Expedition. In September 1915, he was assigned to command the 15th Infantry Regiment in Tientsin, China (now Tianjin). In October 1915, Morrison was promoted to brigadier general as commander of United States Forces in China.

== World War I ==
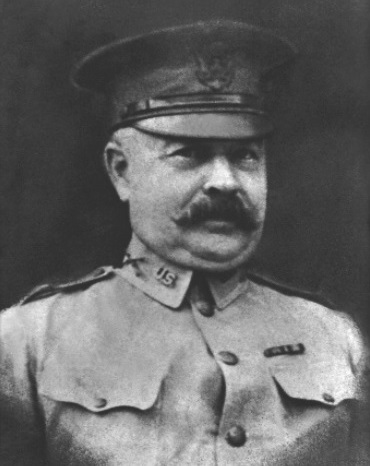
Morrison circa 1920. Fort Leavenworth Hall of Fame.

In May 1917, a month after the American entry into World War I, Morrison was promoted to major general and assigned to command Fort Oglethorpe, Georgia. From August to September 1917, he commanded the 30th Division at Camp Sevier, South Carolina. From September to December 1917, Morrison served in France as a military observer. He then served in Washington, D.C. until March 1918 as the Army's Director of Training.

From March to June 1918, Morrison commanded the 8th Division at Camp Fremont, California. From June 1918 to August 1919, he was stationed in San Francisco as commander of the Army's Western Department. His wartime accomplishments were recognized with award of the Army Distinguished Service Medal.

=== Army Distinguished Service Medal citation ===
The President of the United States of America, authorized by Act of Congress, July 9, 1918, takes pleasure in presenting the Army Distinguished Service Medal to Major General John Frank Morrison, United States Army, for exceptionally meritorious and distinguished services to the Government of the United States, in a duty of great responsibility during World War I, for services as Department Commander, Western Department, in handling with great skill, tact, and sound judgment many difficult problems arising in his department. Service: Army Rank: Major General Division: Western Department General Orders: War Department, General Orders No. 47 (1919)

== Later career ==
From August 1919 to April 1920, Morrison was commander of the post at Camp Lewis, Washington. Beginning in May 1920, Morrison was commander of the Southeastern Department and Fourth Corps Area. He left the military after reaching the mandatory retirement age of 64 in December 1921.

== Retirement and death ==
In retirement, Morrison resided in Washington, D.C. He died at Walter Reed Army Medical Center in Washington on October 22, 1932. Morrison was buried at Arlington National Cemetery. In accordance with his wishes, there were no military honors at his funeral. Instead, a single bugler was present to sound Taps.

== Family ==
On August 16, 1887, Morrison married Kate L. McCleery, the daughter of Army chaplain J. B. McCleery. They were married until her death in 1929. The Morrisons had no children. Kate McCleery Morrison was the sister of Margaret McCleery, the wife of Major General Benjamin Alvord Jr.

== Legacy ==
Morrison was a highly regarded trainer and instructor, and authored written works on military operations, including 1914's Seventy Problems: Infantry Tactics, Battalion, Brigade and Division and Training Infantry.

Morrison's abilities as an instructor while at Fort Leavenworth were recognized Army-wide. George C. Marshall, who studied under Morrison and became Army Chief of Staff in 1939, later said that Morrison "taught me all I had ever known of tactics". From the 1920s through to World War II, officers who could say "I was a Morrison man" had professional cachet that commanded respect from their peers.

In 1974, Morrison was inducted into the Fort Leavenworth Hall of Fame. The Hall of Fame was founded in 1969, and honors members of the Army who significantly contributed to the history, heritage and traditions of the Army while stationed at Fort Leavenworth.

The John F. Morrison Professor of Military History was created in 1974 by the U.S. Army Command and General Staff College. A distinguished historian is selected to hold this visiting professorship every academic year.
