= Lawson Nicholson =

American engineer

Lawson Ambrose Nicholson
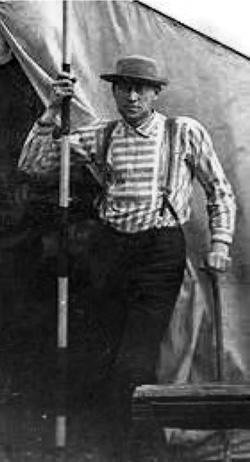
- Born: March 3, 1866; Stockton, California
- Died: March 1, 1947 (aged 80); Tacoma, Washington
- Resting place: Mountain View Memorial Park, Lakewood, Washington
- Education: Washington College, Tacoma
- Occupations: City Engineer for Everett, Washington; City Engineer for Tacoma, Washington; surveyor
- Years active: 1888–1947
- Known for: A Washington State pioneer, engineer, and surveyor. Was Everett's first City Engineer, twice served as Tacoma City Engineer, and was City Engineer of Steilacoom and Ruston. Participated in cities' development and municipal affairs as well as the building of major constructions.
- Spouse: Elizabeth James (m. 1892)
- Children: 2 sons, 1 stepson
- Parents: Albert S. Nicholson (father); Mary Nicholson (Warner) (mother)

Lawson Ambrose Nicholson (March 3, 1866 – March 1, 1947) was a Washington State pioneer, engineer, and surveyor. He gained public recognition working on many engineering and municipal tasks during the development of Tacoma, Everett and other cities of northwest.

Nicholson served as City Engineer in Everett, Tacoma, Steilacoom and Ruston. He became a pioneer of Everett at the time of its foundation and was its first City Engineer, serving one term in 1893. Nicholson spent most of his life in Tacoma. He served as Tacoma City Engineer twice, in 1904 and in 1916. The City Council unanimously supported his candidacy.

Nicholson was considered a valuable advisor, and often took charge of important city projects, such as the building of the Tacoma Terminal Company and Tacoma Speedway. He helped build the Tacoma Stadium Bowl and the Ruston Tunnel, which later became the "last visible remnant" of the American Smelting and Refining Company.

Over the years, Nicholson worked as a surveyor in different counties. He was a partner and a senior partner in a number of surveyor firms, working on land survey, litigation, and legal description, municipal projects, and working as an engineer on waterfront and waterways. He took part in court proceedings as an expert in the field. For about forty years, he surveyed plats for the Washington State Department of Natural Resources, which manages public lands and aquatic areas of Washington State. Nicholson was engineer for the state harbor line commission, surveyed the Sidney, Marysville, and Snohomish harbors, and created several Tacoma maps.

Citizens of Tacoma paid Nicholson tribute by putting the sign he created, Tacoma's Star of Destiny, near the bronze statue of Allen C. Mason, promoter, who made the sign popular through advertisements in major U.S. newspapers.

== Early life and family ==
Nicholson was born on March 3, 1866, in Stockton, California. His parents were the Rev. Albert S. Nicholson, an Episcopalian clergyman, religious leader and educator from Pennsylvania, and Mary Nicholson (Warner). Albert Nicholson moved from Pennsylvania to California in 1862. In 1868, he took his family to Vancouver, Washington, where he built the first city church and parish. In 1886, the family moved to Tacoma, Washington, where Albert and Mary Nicholson spent their later years and Lawson Nicholson spent most of his life.

== Education and first jobs ==
Nicholson learned engineering through private tutors and self-study in Vancouver, Washington, until 1882. After mastering the theory, he developed his skills in practice. His first job was as an apprentice in a sash and door factory, where he spent a year. In 1883, he entered the building material business, and worked in it until 1886. After the family moved to Tacoma, Nicholson entered Washington College. He combined his studies with the job of a school teacher for a year.

== Career ==
=== Everett, Washington ===
In 1893, Nicholson left Tacoma for two years to go to the newly founded city of Everett. Nicholson was appointed Everett City Engineer at one of the first meetings of the first Everett Council. He served one term during 1893.

Besides his main duties in Everett, Nicholson did "some important work" for Rucker Brothers, one of the first pioneers and businessmen of Everett.

=== Tacoma, Washington ===
==== Engineering ====
Eventually, Nicholson returned to Tacoma, and spent more than 20 years there. At first, Nicholson worked as a general engineer, but later worked more exclusively on the street railroad construction. By 1903, Nicholson occupied "a very credible and enviable position" and was well known in the city.

On January 20, 1904, Nicholson became Tacoma City Engineer for the first time, serving for six months. The same year, he worked as Chief Engineer for the newly incorporated Tacoma Terminal Company, which managed a freight and passenger business in Tacoma.

By 1910, Nicholson had returned to his private practice in civil engineering. He was hired by the Stadium High School to assist architect Frederick Heath in building the Stadium Bowl, which was considered the "first of its kind" building in the U.S. Nicholson drafted and detailed the building plans for this project.

Over the years, Nicholson served as advisor during important city discussions. In 1912, he took part in the meeting of the Puyallup Commercial Club, and addressed the citizens in regard to the Puyallup river development and measures to preserve farmland. As the construction of Panama Canal in 1914 led to boost of trade in the Pacific Northwest, Nicholson offered advice as to the development and improvement of the business waterways and tide flats of Tacoma.

In 1914, Nicholson became Engineer in Charge for the building of the Tacoma racing track. At the time, Nicholson himself estimated the construction as "the most expensive speedway on the continent."

In 1916, Nicholson again became City Engineer, his candidacy being unanimously supported by the City Council despite a number of other aspirants for the position. This time, he was put in charge of all city engineering work. His duties included leading departments that previously operated in separate offices: he managed power, water works, general drafting, and engineering works.

==== Surveying ====
From 1888 to 1891, Nicholson became A. H. Lindley's partner in the Tacoma surveyor firm Lindley & Nicholson. In 1895, Lindley moved to the east coast, and Nicholson proceeded to work alone. His projects included land surveys, litigation, and legal descriptions, municipal work, and waterfront and waterways engineering. By that time, Nicholson was a respectable engineer whose expert opinion was considered valuable in court proceedings.

In 1898, the company was re-established as Lindley, Nicholson & Bullard. In 1900, as Lindley abandoned the partnership, the company was transformed again into Nicholson & Bullard, with Nicholson as the senior member. From 1931 to 1947, Nicholson headed a surveying business called Nicholson & Sons. Over the years, Nicholson drafted and issued several standard Tacoma maps.

Between 1904 and 1917, Nicholson worked for the Washington State Department of Natural Resources (DNR) (the department that manages forest, range, agricultural, and commercial lands and aquatic areas in Washington State) in Public Land Survey Office. He surveyed 124 plats there. Starting in 1919 and continuing until his death in 1947, he was listed among DNR surveyors working in different counties.

=== Other activity ===
Besides working on important engineer tasks in Tacoma, Nicholson participated in many municipal projects in other northwestern cities. He served as engineer for the state harbor line commission and surveyed the harbors in Sidney, Marysville, and Snohomish.

Nicholson served as City Engineer of Steilacoom, Washington, from 1906 to 1913, and of Ruston, Washington, from 1905 to 1915.

In Ruston, Nicholson worked on the construction of the Ruston Tunnel, which was later considered the "last visible remnant of the former American Smelting and Refining Company smelter site." The construction begun in 1912, and the tunnel stood until it was demolished in 2011.

Nicholson designed and drew a star that was later called Tacoma's Star of Destiny. The sign appeared in series of the major U.S. newspaper advertisements placed by promoter Allen C. Mason. Later, the star was installed near the bronze statue of Mason in Tacoma, honoring Nicholson as its designer.

From 1945 to 1947, Nicholson lived in semi-retirement.

== Personal life ==
Nicholson married Elizabeth James in 1892. They had two children, Harold and Charles, and a stepson, Morton.

Lawson Nicholson died on March 1, 1947, in his home in Tacoma.

== See also ==
- Albert S. Nicholson
- Stadium Bowl
- Tacoma Speedway
- Rucker Brothers
- Stockton, California

== Literature cited ==
- Bridges, John, ed. (April 11, 1904), "Bullard for engineer", Evening Statesman, Walla Walla: Statesman Pub. Co., p. 2, ISSN 2331-9771, LCCN sn88085421, OCLC 17397533
- Blethen, Alden J., ed. (October 20, 1907), "Tacoma may have terminal company", Seattle Daily Times, Seattle: The Seattle Times Company, p. 37, ISSN 2639-4898, LCCN sn86072007, OCLC 1765328
- Scripps, Edward, ed. (May 14, 1912), "Improve Puyallup", The Tacoma Times, Tacoma: E. W. Scripps Company, p. 8, ISSN 2158-4729, LCCN sn88085187, OCLC 17347623
- Scripps, Edward, ed. (January 16, 1914), "The best way", The Tacoma Times, Tacoma: E. W. Scripps Company, p. 1, ISSN 2158-4729, LCCN sn88085187, OCLC 17347623
- Blethen, Alden J., ed. (May 24, 1914), "Tacoma builds lightning-fast racing course", Seattle Daily Times, Seattle: The Seattle Times Company, p. 43, ISSN 2639-4898, LCCN sn86072007, OCLC 1765328
- Scripps, Edward, ed. (May 3, 1916), "Nicholson is appointed as city engineer", The Tacoma Times, Tacoma: E. W. Scripps Company, p. 1, ISSN 2158-4729, LCCN sn88085187, OCLC 17347623
- "Nicholson Funeral Set for Tomorrow", Seattle Daily Times, Seattle: The Seattle Times Company, p. 24, March 3, 1947, ISSN 2639-4898, LCCN sn86072007, OCLC 1765328
- Adolphus, Emell Derra, ed. (September 2, 2008), "Tribute helps Tacoma's Star shine again", Point of Beginning, Troy: BNP Media
- "Lawson Ambrose Nicholson (1866-1947)" (PDF), olsonengr.com, Vancouver: Olson Engineering, Inc., July 2, 2013
- "Short Biographies and Personal Notes M - R", DocPlayer.net, DocPlayer, Inc., September 19, 2017
- Erickson, K. A. (July 17, 2011), Baughn, James (ed.), "Ruston Tunnel", Bridgehunter.com: Historic and Notable Bridges of the United States, James Baughn and contributors, OCLC 612983467
- Hunt, Herbert (1916), Tacoma its history and its builders; a half century of activity, vol. 1, Chicago: S. J. Clarke Publishing Company, LCCN 18005073, OCLC 656923949
- Olson, Jerry C. (February 27, 2011a), "Surveyors for the State of Washington" (PDF), olsonengr.com, Vancouver: Olson Engineering, Inc., pp. 153–154
- Olson, Jerry C. (February 27, 2011b), "Surveyors by Registration Number", olsonengr.com, Vancouver: Olson Engineering, Inc., p. 11
- Prosser, William Farrand (1903), Lewis, Edward Gardner (ed.), A history of the Puget Sound country, its resources, its commerce and its people, New York City: Edward Gardner Lewis, LCCN 05013767
- Shiach, William Sidney; Averill, Harrison B. (1906), An Illustrated History of Skagit and Snohomish Counties: their people, their commerce and their resources, with an outline of the early history of the state of Washington (PDF), Chicago: Interstate Publishing Company, LCCN 06030900, OCLC 11299996
