= Joseph M. Fletcher =

American lawyer

Joseph Fletcher

5th Mayor of Vancouver, Washington Territory
- In office January 1, 1869 – January 1, 1871
- Preceded by: A. G. Tripp
- Succeeded by: O. A. Freeman

Personal details
- Born: November 5, 1831 England
- Died: March 23, 1882 (aged 51) Vancouver, Washington Territory, U.S.
- Spouse(s): Rhoda Fletcher (died 1868); Sara Kidwell
- Children: 3 (1 deceased); 2 stepchilder

Joseph M. Fletcher (November 5, 1831 – March 12, 1882) was a British-born American attorney, civic leader, politician, and government land agent in the Washington Territory. He served on the city council of Vancouver, Washington, and eventually became mayor.

== Early years life and education ==
Fletcher was born on November 5, 1831, in England. As a child, his family immigrated to the United States, settling in the state of Maryland. Fletcher and his wife, Rhoda, left Maryland and moved west to Vancouver in June 1861. They purchased two lots near St. Luke's Episcopal Church and built a house there. The Fletchers joined the parish at St. Luke's, with Rhoda being baptized by Reverend John D. McCarty in 1861.

== Career ==
In 1861, President Abraham Lincoln appointed Fletcher as Register of the Vancouver, Washington Territory branch of the United States General Land Office. The General Land Office was charged with administrating the conveyance of public lands to those claiming the lands as a part of homesteading or otherwise, in the form of a Land patent. For a new territory, this office was at the center of the local business development efforts.

At St. Luke's, Fletcher was an active leader of the parish. He was one of the incorporators when St. Luke's became the first Episcopal Church in the Washington Territory to be incorporated. He served on the Vestry, along with other civic and military leaders including Louis Sohns, Henry C. Hodges, and John McNeil Eddings, and was the Senior Warden when the church was consecrated in 1868 by Benjamin Wistar Morris (bishop). Typically Senior Wardens only serve for a few years, yet Joseph Fletcher served from 1868 through 1875, and again in 1881, working with the church's second rector, Reverend Albert S. Nicholson. He also served as the Superintendent of Sunday School during this period. Perhaps not as notable as some would like, but in perspective to his many other duties and activities during this time, it illustrates his commitment to service as well as popularity amongst his peers.

Practicing both as an attorney and land office agent, Fletcher quickly became involved in local civic and political affairs. On June 25, 1862, the Clarke County Committee of the Union Convention elected Fletcher to be a part of this committee. He participated in writing their announcement that "dissolution of the Union was unfounded and unwarranted." In 1863 he was indicated on a stock certificate as being the Corporate Secretary for the Columbia Transportation Company. The company was in business to transport people from the east coast to the west coast of the United States during the Gold Rush. The company would pick up and deliver passengers traveling on the Panama Railroad in South America and bring them to California and the Washington Territory. On October 7, 1865, Fletcher was the secretary of a public meeting held in Vancouver to discuss bringing Union soldier orphans to Vancouver

On October 31, 1865, a small group of local men proposed themselves as a slate for the upcoming city elections. They called themselves the "People's Ticket". Fletcher was a member of that group. Local reaction was sharply against this action, and a convention of the local Union Party (Republican) was convened. Interesting enough, many on the People's Ticket were also in attendance, and Fletcher was elected Secretary by the convention. The Union Party selected a separate slate for the city elections, which included about half of the other slate, as well as Mr. Fletcher. It would seem that Fletcher was able to politically navigate a delicate 'storm' successfully. On November 11, 1865, Mr. Fletcher joined the Common Council of Vancouver, and became its recording clerk also. Fletcher was known as a gifted and humorous speaker and writer. For instance, in writing about the local Fourth of July celebrations, the newspaper said of him, "Mr. Fletcher is one of our readiest off-hand speakers". In November 1869, Fletcher was elected Mayor of Vancouver. He served for two years in that position. In November, 1872, Fletcher was elected Prosecuting Attorney for the 2nd Judicial District. He also served on numerous commissions associated with town and county administration, including the Board of Townsite Commissioners in 1878.

Fletcher was known for his sense of humor as well as writing and speaking abilities. As an attorney, Fletcher dealt with a wide variety of clients and cases. One of his advertisements in 1875 shows a "particular attention to conveyancing and examination of land titles."

In 1881, Fletcher was elected once again to be the Senior Warden at St. Luke's. As such, he would have participated in the arrangements for the First Convocation of the Protestant Episcopal Church of the Missionary Jurisdiction of Washington (the precursor to the Episcopal Diocese of Olympia). The convocation was held at St. Luke's on August 24, 1881. Noted in a copy of the proceedings is that Fletcher also served on the Diocesan Board of Missions, and was the Treasurer of that board.

== Personal life ==
Fletcher and his wife Rhoda had three children. Lizzie was born in October, 1862, Alice was born in June, 1865, and William was born in 1868. William died at the age of nine months, in October, 1868. One month later, on November 5, 1868, Rhoda Fletcher died. The brief obituary in the newspaper noted that Rhoda was 31 and died of "disease of the brain". Joseph was so grief-stricken that he sold his house and lots, fully furnished, to St. Luke's as a parsonage, at a low price for the time, just one month later. Alice died years later.

On May 8, 1869, Fletcher posted a notice in the local paper saying that he would be going "back East" for two months, and that the duties of Land Register would be handled by the Land Receiver in the office. When he returned to Vancouver, Fletcher was married to a widow from Maryland, Sara Kidwell, who had two children, Clara and Robert. Robert F. Kidwell died on June 21, 1876. A memorial window was installed in St. Luke's in Robert's memory by his family.

On October 7, 1880, during a visit to Vancouver by President Rutherford B. Hayes, Fletcher was called upon to make an impromptu speech. He honored the school children and orphans assembled to meet and sing to the President. This was typical of his interest and support for children, singing, and education throughout his life.

== Disappearance and death ==
In 1881, Fletcher became the Corporate Secretary for the People's Transportation Company. This steamer riverboat company, located at the main wharf of Vancouver, provided freight and person transportation daily on the Columbia River The local newspaper continued to indicate that Fletcher was involved, as attorney, in numerous of cases, often related to land disputes, however also dealing with other community matters. One set of cases mentioned in 1881 concerned his representation for a number of plaintiffs against the Cascade Rail Road Company, in a land dispute amounting to over $100,000.

On March 2, 1882, the local newspaper mentioned that "The Columbia River is rising lively occasioned by the late heavy rains." In the same column it stated "Yesterday Joseph M. Fletcher lost on the street a roll of greenbacks amounting to $170 which he was fortunate enough to find again a short time afterwards."

On March 23, 1882, Fletcher was reported missing by the local paper, The Vancouver Independent. It was reported that he was last seen the previous Wednesday in the vicinity of his office, at Fifth and Main Street, at seven-thirty at night, walking toward the river. He was last seen wearing a beaver coat, white shirt with pearl studs and tie, and fine leather boots. There was no reason to suspect any problems with his affairs according to his friends and business associates. The local Masonic Lodge, of which he was a longtime member and officer, offered a reward for information about his disappearance. A local newspaper reported that he was near-sighted and had left his home without his glasses, something that he had never done before. The paper also reported that his financial situation was in order, and so was the accounting at the People's Transportation Company, of which he was the Secretary.

On September 7, 1882, the Vancouver Independent reported that Fletcher's body was found downstream in the Columbia River. Although the body showed signs of long-term water exposure, he was still dressed in the same clothes he had last been seen wearing. Because the local coroner was not available, no autopsy was completed. An inquest panel determined that his death was by drowning, although the cause was never officially confirmed.
