= Henry Eugene Hodges =

American serial killer on Tennessee's death row

- May 1990 Shelby Police booking photo of Henry Hodges
- Born: August 16, 1966 (age 60); Florida, U.S.
- Status: Incarcerated on death row in Tennessee
- Conviction: First-degree murder (3 counts)
- Penalty: Tennessee; Death; Life imprisonment Georgia; Life imprisonment

Details
- Victims: 3–8
- Date: 1988 – 1990
- Country: United States
- Locations: Tennessee, Georgia
- Imprisoned at: Riverbend Maximum Security Institution

Henry Eugene Hodges (born August 16, 1966) is an American convicted serial killer and former sex worker who was found guilty of three murders: stabbing 34-year-old Barry McDonald in Tennessee on July 14, 1989; robbing and killing 37-year-old Ronald Bassett in Tennessee on May 14, 1990; and strangling 32-year-old Michael Whisnant in Georgia on May 16, 1990.

Hodges was arrested two days after murdering Whisnant. In Tennessee, he was sentenced to death for the murder of Ronald Bassett, while he received two life sentences for the other two killings in Georgia and Tennessee. He is on death row at the Riverbend Maximum Security Institution.

== Early life ==
Henry Eugene Hodges was born on August 16, 1966, in Florida. Hodges's father, who was a truck driver, was married to another woman; Hodges's parents would maintain an 18-year extramarital relationship with each other. Despite this, Hodges's mother alone took care of Hodges and her four other sons, and received little support from the two fathers of her five sons. Hodges's father was abusive towards his mother.

At the age of 12, Hodges was raped by a stranger, which reportedly traumatized him. At around the same age, Hodges began to hang out with older boys, engage in delinquent activities, sniff glue and gasoline, play truant and run away from home. Hodges began a sexual relationship with his younger brother and attempted to do the same thing with his female cousin.

In 1984, at the age of 17, Hodges was convicted of kidnapping and robbery and sentenced to four years imprisonment. Upon his release in 1988, he started to work part-time as a printer and construction worker, and at the same time, he also became a male prostitute to make ends meet, and offered sexual services to homosexual clients. Hodges frequented numerous local gay bars in Midtown, Tennessee, where he was often seen offering his services. Hodges was known for his violent behavior, and local gay bars began warning prospective lovers to be wary of him.

== Murders ==
Between 1988 and 1990, Hodges committed aa many as eight murders of men, most of whom were homosexual. While three of the victims were definitively linked to Hodges, he remained a suspect in the other cases.

=== Confirmed ===
==== Barry McDonald ====
On July 9, 1989, Hodges stabbed and killed 34-year-old Canadian-born Inglewood nurse Barry McDonald in Tennessee.

On that day, Hodges entered McDonald's home and robbed him before stabbing him 38 times, resulting in his death. McDonald's body was found three days later by his roommate, and the police produced a description of the suspect based on a neighbor’s account that he saw a White man of slender build and blonde hair through McDonald's kitchen window on the date Hodges killed McDonald. An autopsy report showed that the knife wounds on McDonald's back and neck were the cause of his death. Police suspected that McDonald was likely targeted due to his homosexuality and labeled it as the "most violent crime in this city's history".

McDonald's murder remained unsolved for nearly a year before Hodges was arrested for another murder, and evidence linked him to the crime. The fingerprints recovered by police from McDonald's house were matched to Hodges.

==== Ronald A. Bassett ====
On May 14, 1990, Hodges committed the murder of 37-year-old telephone repairman Ronald Allen Bassett, also in Tennessee.

On that night, Hodges and his 15-year-old girlfriend, a runaway named Trina Brown, went out to look for a victim to rob and kill, after the couple, who had been staying with Hodges's half-brother in Smyrna, Tennessee, agreed to move to Florida and needed money to facilitate their move. The couple also hatched a plan to lure a male client to meet with Hodges under the pretext of offering his sexual services.

At a park in Nashville, Hodges met up with Ronald Bassett, who happened to be the next client propositioning him. Bassett and Hodges left the park in the former's car. After reaching Bassett's house, Hodges tied up Bassett's feet with tape, handcuffed him, and forced him to lie face-down inside his bedroom. Hodges later ransacked the house with Brown (who joined Hodges later on), and they took some valuables (including some jewelry, a gun, and a VCR) and Bassett's identification card. After discussing whether to spare or kill Bassett, Hodges strangled Bassett to death with a nylon rope in spite of Bassett's plea for mercy.

After murdering Bassett, Hodges and Brown stayed at the house longer to remove fingerprints and clean up the crime scene to destroy evidence. The couple left the house in Bassett's car with the stolen property, and withdrew $400 from an ATM using the card of Bassett. However, a day later, the couple found out through the news that Bassett's body was discovered, and thus, they abandoned Bassett's car at another location and fled to Georgia in their own car.

==== Michael A. Whisnant ====
On May 16, 1990, two days after he killed Bassett, Hodges killed 32-year-old quality control engineer Michael Whisnant in a hotel in Atlanta, Georgia.

On that day, after they met at a gay bar, Hodges made arrangements with Whisnant to engage in homosexual acts with him in exchange for a payment of $75. Although Hodges and Whisnant went to the former's hotel room after agreeing to the price, Whisnant was unable to pay the agreed price and instead paid $25. As a result, Hodges handcuffed Whisnant and strangled him to death with a curtain cord.

Whisnant's body was left under the bed. Although the hotel maid cleaned up the room without noticing the body, a security officer found the body and lodged a police report shortly before 9 pm.

=== Suspected victims ===
Hodges was named a suspect behind the killings of at least five men, three of whom were identified by the police.

==== Vernon L. Larkin ====
On September 4, 1988, Vernon Lester Larkin, a 30-year-old data analyst, was allegedly killed by Hodges after he was last seen leaving a gay bar, and his body, gagged and bound, was found three days later in the living room of his apartment. The scene was covered in blood spatter, and Larkin had apparently been brutally beaten.

==== Roland E. Van Dyck ====
On September 20, 1989, Roland E. Van Dyck was discovered dead inside the trunk of his car, and several gunshot wounds were found on his head.

==== Robert S. Sibert ====
On October 22, 1989, Robert S. Sibert, a college professor, was shot to death at an unknown location in Tennessee.

As for the other two murders, the police had not released the victims' identities. However, according to the police, most of these murders shared some traits, which were the fact that the victims were either bisexual or homosexual, and that they were found dead inside their homes or apartments.

== Arrest ==
On May 18, 1990, Hodges and Brown were arrested near Whisnant's house in Shelby, North Carolina, after they were identified as the suspects behind Whisnant's killing and a warrant of arrest was issued by Georgia police.

After his arrest, Hodges confessed to the 1990 murders of both Whisnant and Bassett, as well as the then-unsolved murder of McDonald in 1989. In total, Hodges confessed to at least eight murders, and said that he had lured most of his victims by offering his services before he killed them. The police were also able to link Hodges to the alleged murders purportedly committed by him. As a result of his capture and confession, Hodges was charged with the murder of Whisnant in Georgia, as well as the murders of McDonald and Bassett in Tennessee.

Hodges's arrest brought shock to the homosexual community and public attention was centered on the issue of hate crimes against homosexual people, fueling greater feelings of anxiety and fear of anti-homosexual violence in the homosexual community. Official statistics revealed that in 1987, there were a total of 7,008 incidents of violence against homosexual people, which was a 40% increase from 4,986 in 1986.

Additionally, Hodges's profession as a male prostitute and his identification as a serial killer also caused uneasiness and fear among his former clients, who were, in the past, attracted to his looks and personality, which cemented Hodges's image as one with the "seduction of a silk-stocking hooker" and conscience of a "cold-hearted snake." Hodges denied that he was homosexual, but a self-proclaimed former lover of Hodges stated that he believed Hodges was homosexual to a certain extent and craved a relationship that could provide him a measure of support in life.

== Trial proceedings ==
=== Georgia ===
Hodges stood trial first in Georgia for the murder of Michael Whisnant, to which he pleaded innocent. Hodges was indicted by a Fulton County jury on June 5, 1990.

On July 31, 1990, Hodges pleaded guilty to the murder of Whisnant, and he was sentenced to life imprisonment by the Fulton County Superior Court.

=== Tennessee ===
After his conviction for Whisnant's murder in Georgia, Hodges was extradited back to Tennessee to face trial for the murders of Bassett and McDonald.

On January 3, 1991, Hodges was indicted by a Davidson County grand jury for killing McDonald and Bassett. That same month, Hodges offered to confess to at least six murders on the condition that the death penalty was taken off the table.

==== Bassett murder trial ====
The jury selection of Hodges's trial for Bassett's death was slated to begin on January 20, 1992. The prosecution expressed their intent to seek the death penalty for Hodges. The defense lawyers of Hodges planned to argue in mitigation about Hodges's troubled childhood to seek a lesser sentence.

During the trial, Hodges's defense lawyers argued that the murder was driven by a subconscious desire for revenge for the childhood sexual abuse he suffered at age 12, along with a fear that his family would discover he was involved in homosexual prostitution. They said that Brown had told Hodges's sister-in-law shortly before the killing that he was a prostitute. The defense also presented testimony that Brown had dominated and manipulated Hodges. On January 28, 1992, Hodges was found guilty of first-degree murder by the jury.

On January 30, 1992, Hodges was sentenced to death upon the jury's unanimous recommendation for capital punishment.

==== McDonald murder trial ====
By June 1992, Hodges was confirmed to claim trial for the third time for the killing of Whisnant, and Hodges expressed that he wanted to represent himself in his third trial.

On December 22, 1992, Hodges pleaded guilty to the robbery-murder of Whisnant. As a result of this plea of guilt, Hodges was given a second life sentence, plus 30 years in jail for both counts of murder and robbery. According to Davidson County prosecutor Tom Thurman, Hodges remained as a suspect for several other killings but additional charges were unlikely for the time being. In total, Hodges received one death sentence and two sentences of life plus 70 years after three separate trials, and Thurman commented that this would ensure that Hodges will die in prison.

== Appeals ==
On April 28, 1997, the Tennessee Supreme Court dismissed Henry Hodges's appeal against his death sentence.

On October 20, 2000, the Tennessee Court of Criminal Appeals rejected Hodges's appeal.

On March 28, 2008, Hodges's federal appeal was dismissed by U.S. District Judge William Joseph Haynes Jr. of the U.S. District Court for the Middle District of Tennessee.

On August 14, 2013, the 6th U.S. Circuit Court of Appeals turned down Hodges's appeal.

On March 23, 2015, the U.S. Supreme Court dismissed Hodges's final appeal against his death sentence.

== Death row ==
Hodges on death row, 2021

While he was still appealing against his death sentence, Henry Hodges was incarcerated on death row at the Riverbend Maximum Security Institution.

During his early years on death row, Hodges reportedly had disciplinary issues while in prison, and there were at least 32 instances of disciplinary action taken against him. In 1994, Hodges used a razor to slash the throat of fellow death row inmate John Michael Bane, who was convicted in 1990 of the murder of a truck driver, and Bane survived his injuries. In 1996, Hodges also set off a homemade explosive device and it nearly struck a prison officer named Gregory Valdez.

In January 2000, after ten years since the murder of her son, Ronald Bassett's mother Phyllis stated that she wanted Hodges to be put to death for killing her only son. She stated that it was traumatic every time an appeal was filed by Hodges against his death sentence, and she hated the consequences of Hodges's murderous actions that affected their family and Bassett's friends.

=== Self-mutilation incident ===
On October 7, 2022, Hodges used a razor to chop off his genitals, after he slit his own wrists and pleaded with the guards to place him under suicide watch. After he severed his genitals and received treatment (including re-attachment of his genitals), Hodges was reportedly restrained naked to the bed by turns at four and six points in a solitary cell.

On October 27, 2022, Hodges's lawyers filed a lawsuit in relation to a self-mutilation incident in prison. They argued that this violated Hodges's constitutional rights, as the prison could have better ways to manage Hodges's condition and prevent him from posing a danger to others without having to tie him down "like an animal". That same month, Davidson County Chancellor I’Ashea Myles ruled in favour of Hodges, directing the prison department to provide him better care and also clothing and other necessities while continuing to monitor his condition and restrain him for his safety.

On December 12, 2022, the lawsuit was stayed for 90 days, with the judge allowing time for Hodges to exhaust his administrative appeals over his alleged mistreatment by prison officials.

Two newspapers, the Associated Press and the Nashville Banner, requested to the court for public access to records detailing the treatment of Hodges and his confinement. On January 18, 2023, Myles allowed the media to gain access to the video of Hodges in his prison cell, and the video recording of Hodges being restrained to the bed was first shown in February 2023. It was further updated that despite the re-attachment of his genitals, doctors surgically removed his genitals after necrosis began to appear.

=== Motions for Hodges's execution date ===
On September 24, 2019, Tennessee Attorney-General Herbert Slatery petitioned to the Tennessee Supreme Court to schedule the execution dates of nine prisoners on Tennessee's death row, and Henry Hodges was one of the prisoners named on the list.

In January 2025, it was revealed through the Nashville Banner that a petition for Hodges's death warrant is still pending before the Tennessee Supreme Court.

=== Current status ===
As of 2026, Henry Eugene Hodges remains on death row at the Riverbend Maximum Security Institution, awaiting his execution.

== See also ==
- Capital punishment in Tennessee
- List of death row inmates in the United States § Tennessee
- List of serial killers in the United States
