= Henry Clay Hodges Jr. =

United States Army officer (1860–1963)

Henry Clay Hodges, Jr.
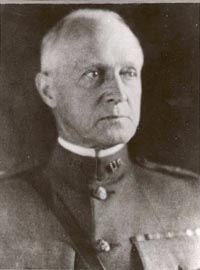
- Hodges in uniform, c. 1919
- Born: April 20, 1860; Vancouver, Washington, United States
- Died: July 15, 1963 (aged 103); Stamford, Connecticut, United States
- Burial place: Arlington National Cemetery
- Spouse(s): Netta Haines; Carrie Jones
- Children: 3
- Relatives: Henry C. Hodges (father); George Abernethy (grandfather)
- Military career
- Allegiance: United States
- Branch: United States Army
- Service years: 1881–1920
- Rank: Major General
- Service number: 0-13131
- Commands: 2d Battalion, 22nd Infantry Regiment; 17th Infantry Regiment; 1st Infantry Regiment; 39th Division; 17th Division; Hawaiian Department
- Conflicts: American Indian Wars; Moro Rebellion; Mexican Border War; World War I

Henry Clay Hodges Jr. (April 20, 1860 – July 15, 1963) was a United States Army officer in the late 19th and early 20th centuries. He served in several conflicts, including World War I.

== Early life and education ==
Hodges was born at Fort Vancouver, Washington Territory, on April 20, 1860. His father was Henry C. Hodges, an Army officer, and his mother, Annie Abernethy, was the daughter of George Abernethy, the first elected governor of Oregon Territory. Hodges was appointed to the United States Military Academy at West Point, New York, by Ulysses S. Grant, who was friends with his father, and he graduated in 1881, 23rd in a class of 53. He was the second youngest member of his class.

Among his classmates included several men who would, like Hodges himself, eventually attain the rank of general officer, such as Joseph T. Dickman, Enoch Crowder, John Biddle, Clarence Page Townsley, Francis Joseph Kernan, Joseph Alfred Gaston, Charles H. Barth, George True Bartlett, Edwin St. John Greble and John Frank Morrison.

== Early career ==
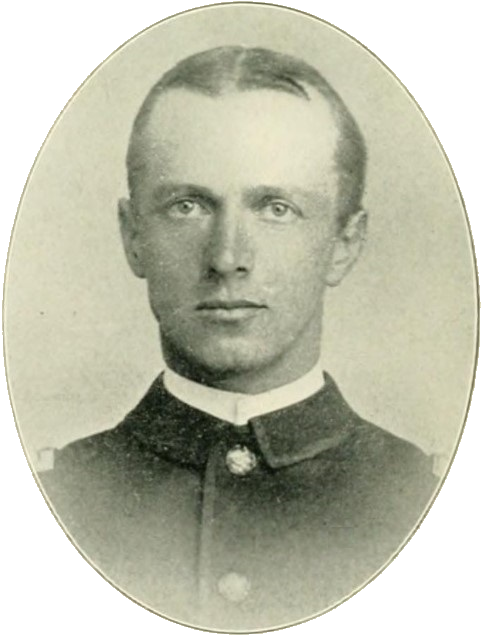
Hodges as a captain in 1902.

Hodges was commissioned into the 22nd Infantry Regiment, and he initially was stationed at Fort Clark, Texas. While there, he helped round up some Comanche Indians who had escaped their reservation. Hodges served as an aide to General Christopher C. Augur from 1884 to 1885, and he worked at United States Military Academy in 1886 as an assistant professor of mathematics. He then was stationed at Fort Keogh.

Hodges taught at the Groton School and then at the University of New Hampshire as Professor of Military Science and Tactics. After serving at Fort Crook, Nebraska, starting in 1896, Hodges was sent to the Philippines in 1899. He participated in putting down the Moro Rebellion and fought in eleven battles there. After serving in Boston and Newport, Rhode Island, Hodges returned to the Philippines.

Hodges graduated from the United States Army War College in 1909. After serving as Secretary of the General Staff from June 11, 1913, to August 31, 1914, he went to the 17th Infantry Regiment in Eagle Pass, Texas, because of the Mexican Border War.

== World War I ==
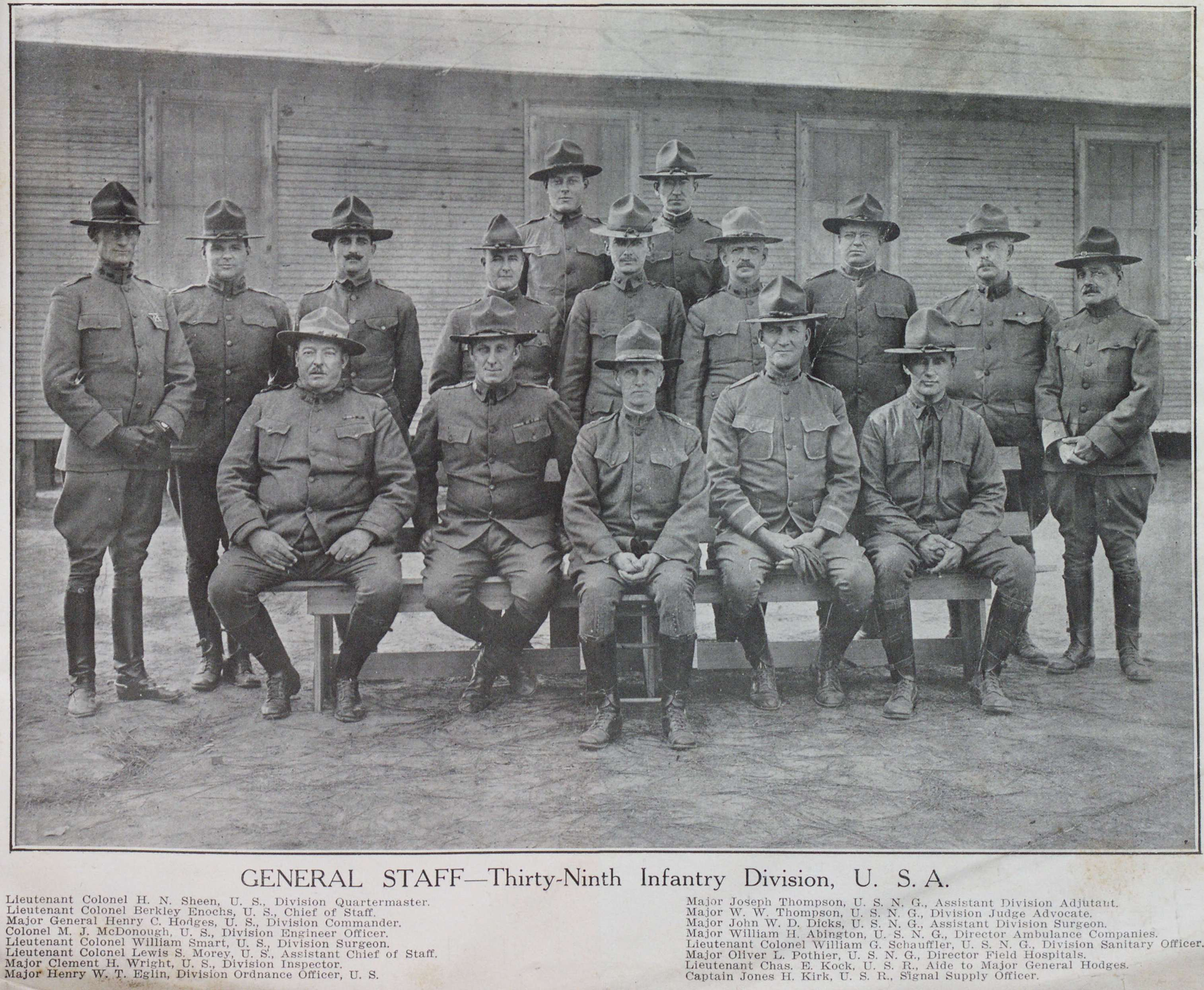
Major General Henry C. Hodges Jr., seated in the front row, third from the left, together with members of the staff of his 39th Division, 1918.

Hodges was promoted to the rank of major general on August 5, 1917, almost three months after the American entry into World War I, and assumed command over the 39th Division at Camp Beauregard. When he left the camp with the division, the people of Alexandria, Louisiana gave him a chest with 200 silver coins with his name on them. Hodges served in France during World War I with his division.

Hodges returned to Camp Beauregard after the war ended, and he commanded the 17th Division until its deactivation. Reverting to his permanent rank of brigadier general, after the war came to an end on November 11, 1918, Hodges was sent to Hawaii.

== Later life ==
Hodges retired December 1, 1920, and resided first in Noroton and then in Stamford, Connecticut, after his second wife's death. He was advanced to major general on the retired list by act of Congress in June 1930. Hodges died on July 15, 1963, and at the time of his death, he was the oldest living graduate of United States Military Academy. He is buried at Arlington National Cemetery with his first wife Netta Richmond Haines (1861–1919).

== Personal life ==
Hodges married Netta Richmond Haines on December 24, 1891, and they had three children together. She died in 1919. Hodges then married Carrie Jones on December 27, 1920, and they lived together until her death in 1949.

== Bibliography ==
- Davis, Henry Blaine Jr. (1998). Generals in Khaki. Raleigh, North Carolina: Pentland Press. ISBN 1571970886. OCLC 40298151.
