= Louis Sohns =

Civic and Business Leader (1827–1901)

Louis Sohns (April 29, 1827 – May 17, 1901) was a prominent pioneer of Clark County in what was then Washington Territory, as well as a civic leader, Mayor of Vancouver, Washington, and businessman.

== Early years ==
Louis Sohns was born in Beerfelden, Germany. He attended Heidelberg University. At the age of 21, he took part in the 1848 Revolution in Germany. When the rebellion failed, he was arrested and put in jail. Somehow he escaped, and using funds from his family, fled persecution in Germany to the United States where he was naturalized in 1856. One reference describes these emigrants as ‘The Forty-Eighters who immigrated to the United States after the failed revolution left their mark in a number of ways. Generally young and well-educated, they were political activists who often assumed leadership positions in their communities, thus strengthening solidarity and a sense of ethnic identity among German immigrants.’ Upon reaching the United States, Louis Sohns joined the U. S. Army. He was transferred to Fort Vancouver in the Washington Territory, journeying via the Panama Isthmus in 1852. Also on that boat was Captain Ulysses S. Grant, Lt. Henry C. Hodges, and John McNeil Eddings, as they joined the 4th Infantry at the Fort. At a later date, Mayor Sohns greeted General Grant with ‘General, the humble individual who has the honor of addressing and welcoming you now in the behalf of the people of our town, had also the pleasure of landing with you and the old gallant 4th Infantry, 27 years ago at this very spot.’

== Business career ==
After leaving the army in 1856, Sohns worked in various jobs including painting and construction. In 1862 he became a stockholder and founder of the Puget Sound and Columbia River Railroad Company. The company was authorized by the Territory to build a rail line originating in Steillacoom on the Puget Sound through Vancouver and out to the mouth of the Deschutes River on the Columbia River. In 1866, he joined with David F. Shuele to open ‘Sohns and Schuele’, a general merchandise retailer in Vancouver. The company grew in business and products, including shipping of local produce, products, and grain to San Francisco, California. Sohns built a brick structure on Main Street between Fifth and Sixth streets. Although it is still standing (and called the Frontier restaurant), the building has been extensively remodeled In 1867 Sohns and others founded the Clarke County Woolen Manufacturing Company, with the mill site to be located at Salmon Creek, to the north of Vancouver. The local newspaper, in announcing the company's founding, stated ‘Every citizen of this county interested in its welfare ought to aid this project to the extent of his ability.’ This was typical editorial ‘cheerleading’ being done to support the growth of the ‘village’ of Vancouver. Sohns was a principle stockholder in the Vancouver, Kickitat and Yakima Railroad, and a director of the Michigan Mill, the town's largest industry. Louis Sohns founded a successful wood products company, specializing in cooperage and barrels, which shipped to various ports on the west coast, the Puget Sound Manufacturing Company of Puyallup, for which he also served as president. In the late 1870s this company was shipping as many as 3 million barrels to various ports on the West Coast. With other business leaders in Vancouver, including H. G. Struve, Sohns in 1868 founded the first water company for Vancouver. Later in 1881, with David F. Schuele, Sohns also founded the Chrystal Water Company to address the increasing water needs of the growing county. In 1883 Sohns was a principle founder of Vancouver's first bank, First National Bank. He served also as the bank's first president. He continued to preside as president, but left that position in 1889 to serve his second term as Mayor of Vancouver.

== Civic career ==
In 1861, at the age of 34, Sohns was elected Treasurer of Clark County, and served for two years in that position. In 1864 Sohns was elected as the ‘Councilman’ for Clarke, Skamania, and Klikitat, serving in the Washington Territory Legislature. He was declared a Democrat at that time, and won by 17 votes out of 447. In 1865, Sohns was again elected Treasurer of Clark County. Mr. Sohns joined St. Luke's Episcopal Church, and soon became one of its leaders. He was elected nine times to serve on the church's Vestry or leadership team, first in 1870 and the last time in 1889. He continued to be active in church activities throughout the rest of his business and civic career. The close ties Sohns had with St. Luke's rector, Reverend Albert S. Nicholson were evidenced by the rector's involvement, and Sohns's involvement, in local education development in the community. In 1875 Louis Sohns was elected Mayor of Vancouver, after having already served on the city council and various civic committees. He served four years, but returned in 1889 to serve another two years as Mayor. Sohns also served on the Washington Territory Legislature, and was a delegate for the Vancouver area to the State Constitutional Convention in 1889, serving on the Preamble and Bill of Rights, Apportionment and Representation, Revenue and Taxation, and Rules committees of the convention. One of the interesting events in the 1870s in which Sohns, as a businessman, landowner, church leader, and Mayor, played a key part was the ‘St. James Mission Land Claim’. In 1853, Catholic Bishop Augustin-Magloire Blanchet filed a land claim for 640 acres. This was based on an Act of Congress and his interpretation of that law. The law allowed missions to claim their land. The Bishop felt that this included not only the mission land, but that of its parishioners and suppliers. The land claim happened to include most of downtown Vancouver and the Fort Vancouver Reserve, affecting homeowners, businesses, churches (like St. Luke's Episcopal Church at the time), and governments. The land claim initiated several lawsuits, with support as well as opposition from high offices locally and nationally. In 1895 the case was settled by the U.S. Supreme Court, basically in favor of everyone except the Bishop. In the meantime, Sohns is credited with negotiating a set of quit claims between local land owners and the Catholic Diocese. While not recognizing the validity of the land claim, it released any claim for specific property for a sum of money. St. Luke's quit claim on its church property was for $33.33, as an example of the settlement. A prominent local attorney, and member of the parish, Joseph M. Fletcher also participated in this legal action.

Perhaps of interest to illustrate normal civic actions of the times, the following entries were documented in a local newspaper in 1879:

Reported on the Vancouver Mayor's message to the City Council: The city treasury showed cash on hand, $26.70; taxes to collect, $208; ‘total assets,’ $234.70. The ‘registered unpaid orders,’ $214; unregistered unpaid orders, about $50.00; claims against -- the city ‘subject to your orders,’ about $150. -- Thus the city was ‘behind’ about $184. (Note: $184 in 1879 is equivalent to $6,980 in 2025) Reported recommendations from ‘Message of the Mayor’ (Louis Sohns); Special tax to liquidate the $134 debt; grading of Main Street from 6t h Street to the river; beautifying of public places -- park, levee, and cemetery; street lighting ordinance, including a light at city hall; ‘reconstruction’ of fire department; a health and cleanliness ordinance.

In 1886, the Washington Territory Legislature established the State School for Defective Youth in Vancouver, Washington. The act established a "school for the deaf, mute, blind, and feeble minded". Louis Sohns and Charles Brown raised money from local civic leaders, purchased property, and built buildings for the school. They were also added as trustees for the school. Years later the schools were separated into a State School for the Deaf and the Washington School for the Blind. Louis Sohns retired from his active business interests at Sohns and Sons in 1892. Although his health was failing, he continued to be active in civic and personal affairs. until his death in 1901.
