= Henry C. Hodges =

United States Army general (1831–1917)

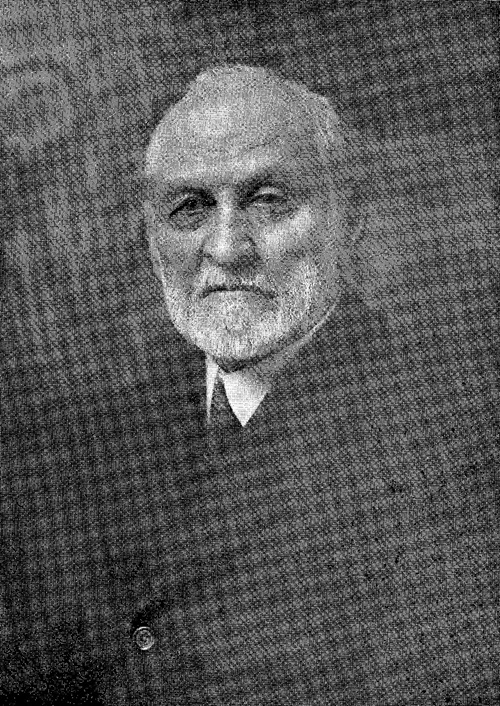
- Born: January 14, 1831; Castleton, Vermont, US
- Died: November 3, 1917 (aged 86); Buffalo, New York, US
- Burial place: Arlington National Cemetery
- Spouse: Annie (Anna) Abernethy
- Children: 2
- Relatives: Henry Clay Hodges, Jr. (son); George Abernethy (father-in-law)
- Military career
- Allegiance: United States
- Branch: United States Army
- Service years: 1851–1895
- Rank: Brigadier General (ret.)
- Conflicts: American Civil War

Henry Clay Hodges (January 14, 1831 – November 3, 1917) was a U.S. Army officer serving as a quartermaster in various places throughout the United States, including during the American Civil War.

== Early years ==
Born in Castleton, Rutland County, Vermont, Hodges was appointed to West Point on July 1, 1847. Although he was only 16 years old, that wasn't uncommon at that time. In Hodges graduating class of 42, 12 were 16 years old when they were admitted to the academy. Hodges graduated 32nd in his class, with low demerits and a good standing in infantry tactics. Upon graduation, Hodges was made a brevet Second Lieutenant in the U.S. 4th Infantry Regiment, and assigned to a frontier post at Fort Howard (Wisconsin). He was soon transferred to Columbia Barracks in the Oregon Territory, as a Second Lieutenant. Hodges served at the location for a year, which was renamed to Fort Vancouver the following year (not to be confused with the older, trade station Fort Vancouver.

In 1853, the Secretary of War Jefferson Davis ordered an exploration of the Northwest for the purposes of a transcontinental railroad. The exploration was divided into Eastern and Western divisions, with the Eastern division working west from the Upper Mississippi River, and the Western division working east from the Puget Sound through the Cascade Range mountains. Lieutenant Hodges was put in charge of the western division's military escort, as well as serving as the group's commissary and quartermaster. Upon completion of the railroad exploration expedition, Hodges was assigned again in 1854. While there, he served on a scouting expedition against the Snake Indians in 1855, as well as in the Army's Yakima Expedition in 1855. Leading that campaign were Major Gabriel J. Rains and Lieutenant Phillip Sheridan. The Yakima Expedition of 1855 did not end well for the Army, nor the Yacamas Indians. For his service, Hodges was promoted to First Lieutenant, and made an adjutant to Fort Vancouver's commander.

While at Fort Vancouver, Lieutenant Hodges periodically served in a military judicial capacity, dealing with disciplinary issues. Stationed at the same fort was General William S. Harney, who was in charge of the larger military district, the Department of Oregon. General Harney, who was also a plantation owner and slave owner, had purchased in 1858 a nearby 100 acre farm and large house. In early 1860, Lt. Hodges was called upon to be the judicial adjutant on several soldiers who were accused of being AWOL. Their excuse was that they were working for General Harney at his farm. Upon conclusion of the investigation, Lt. Hodges delivered the proceedings papers to the fort commander, Captain A. J. Smith, as required.

General Harney filed court-martial papers against Hodges for not delivering the court papers, and for insubordinate language on a document. Hodges was confined to his quarters, and not allowed to appeal through normal channels. Eventually, Hodges was able to send proper appeals to General Winfield Scott, Harney's superior, proving that he was innocent of all charges and unfairly being imprisoned. Scott was already displeased with Harney over the recent diplomatic problem called the Pig War. Scott, and the chief judge advocate, found Hodges completely innocent and ordered his immediate release. Scott further wrote to the Secretary of War, that Harney's action was "an act of stupid outrage which has never been surpassed even in the Turkish army."

== Civil War Service ==
When Ulysses S. Grant came to Fort Vancouver in the early 1850s, he lived at the "Quartermaster Ranch" with Rufus Ingalls, Captain Brent, and Henry C. Hodges. Grant supported Hodges, filling supply orders to outfit the transcontinental railway expedition in 1853. Later during the Civil War, Hodges supported Grant, as a quartermaster in various roles. In 1861, Hodges was reassigned to New York, where he served on the staff of the Governor of New York, doing purchasing, disbursing, arranging transportation, and building various barracks and supply depots in New York and Virginia.

In 1863 Lt. Colonel Hodges was made the Chief Quartermaster of the Army of the Cumberland, reporting to Major General Rosecrans, and participating in the Battle of Chickamauga from September 19–20, 1863. Two days earlier, Hodges had been requested by Secretary of War Edwin M. Stanton to secure 2,000 horses for the cavalry, which he accomplished. Hodges then built supply depots for General Sherman's march through the South. After the Civil War, Hodges was often utilized to reconcile various claims for goods and services incurred during the war by Union troops.

After the War, Colonel Hodges returned to the Northwest, serving as Quartermaster for the Department of Columbia, and at Fort Vancouver. Later he had quartermaster positions in Philadelphia, New York, Arizona, New Orleans, and Washington D.C. Colonel Hodges retired in 1895, moving to Buffalo, New York. On April 23, 1904, by an act of Congress, Hodges was promoted to Brigadier General for his service to his country.

== Private life ==
While at Fort Vancouver the first time, Henry Hodges married Anna "Annie" Abernethy, who was the daughter of the first governor of the Oregon Territory, George Abernethy. They had two children, a daughter who died young, and a son, Henry Clay Hodges Jr. The son also went into the military. Major General Henry C. Hodges, Jr. served in the Spanish–American War and World War I.

Also while serving at Fort Vancouver, Hodges was an active member of the church leadership at St. Luke's Episcopal Church, working with both Rev. John D. McCarty and Rev. Albert S. Nicholson. Hodges and his wife Anna were at the St. Luke's consecration in 1860, which was the first in the Episcopal Missionary District of Washington Territory. As a Senior Warden on the Vestry, Hodges joined Joseph M. Fletcher, Louis Sohns, and other prominent local members as the incorporators of the second Episcopal church in the Washington Territory in 1868. Henry C. Hodges died on November 3, 1917, in Buffalo, New York. He is buried at the Arlington National Cemetery, in Arlington, Virginia.
