= Vancouver Waterfront station =

Proposed transportation hub in Vancouver, Washington

Vancouver Waterfront

General information
- Location: C Street and E 8th Street; Vancouver, Washington; USA
- Coordinates: 45°37′40″N 122°40′7″W
- Owner: City of Vancouver
- Tracks: 2

Construction
- Accessible: yes

Services
Preceding station	TriMet	Following station
Expo Center toward Union Station/NW 5th & Glisan	Yellow Line	Terminus
Location

Vancouver Waterfront is a proposed station on TriMet's MAX Light Rail system as well as a proposed bus depot for C-Tran in the Portland metropolitan area. The station will be built in Vancouver, Washington, just across the Columbia River from Portland, Oregon, and is proposed to be the first MAX station outside of Oregon. It will be built as part of the Interstate Bridge Replacement Program.

Based on the proposal, the station, at about 75 feet, would be the second highest rapid transit station in the United States after Smith–Ninth Streets station in New York City. The station would be located between E Evergreen Boulevard and E 8th Street to the north and south, and Reserve Street and C Street to the east and west, adjacent to Interstate 5.

== History ==
Plans to expand MAX to Washington have been part of talks since MAX was first opened. The first serious attempt was during the proposed Columbia River Crossing project in late-2006. Light rail to Vancouver has been a controversial debate among residents of Clark County, with many speaking both in favor and in opposition to it. The towns of Camas and Battle Ground have passed resolutions in opposition to light rail. Former Vancouver mayors Royce Pollard and Tim Leavitt, the latter of whom also served on the C-Tran board of directors, have both been outspoken in favor of light rail. Current mayor Anne McEnerny-Ogle has been more passive on the issue, but has spoken in favor of light rail.

The new Interstate Bridge Replacement Program calls for light rail to be expanded into Vancouver. In May 2023, the city of Vancouver announced plans to purchase the empty lot at C Street and E 8th Street in Downtown Vancouver for the use of a future light rail station and bus hub. The site was purchased by the city of Vancouver on June 28, 2023 for $12 million. In January 2024, the Interstate Bridge Replacement Program team reveled multiple proposed station plans for the site.
