= Interstate Bridge Replacement Program =

Project in Oregon and Washington

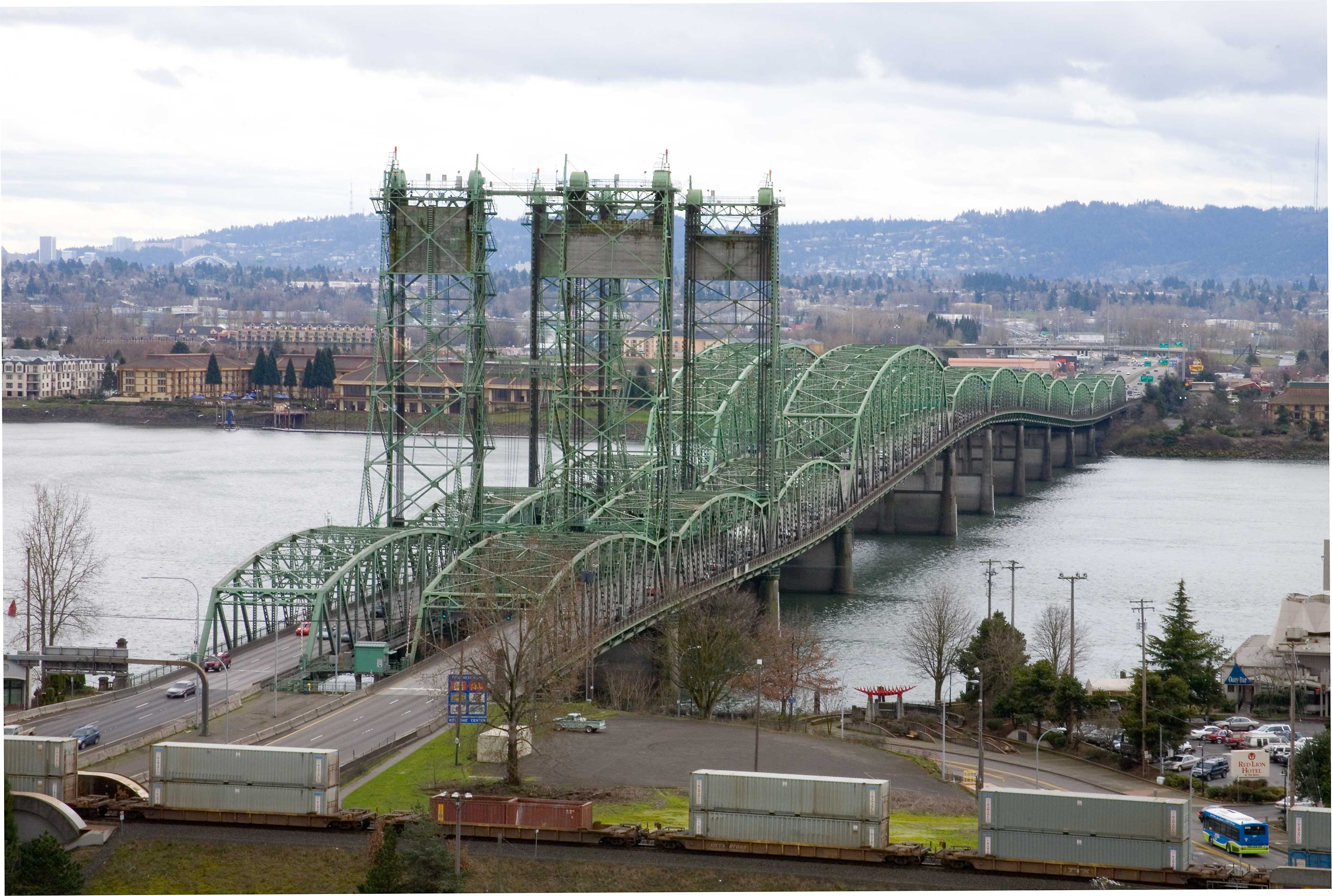
The Interstate Bridge in 2007

The Interstate Bridge Replacement Program is a project to replace the Interstate Bridge connecting Portland, Oregon to Vancouver, Washington via Interstate 5 (I-5). The existing bridge, opened in 1917, is considered insufficient given current traffic patterns and does not meet current seismic standards. Replacement efforts began with the Columbia River Crossing (CRC) project, which terminated in 2013, and were revived in 2017, with the creation of the Joint Oregon-Washington Legislative Action Committee. A Locally Preferred Alternative was released in 2022 and presented to various local governments. Subsequently, the environmental impact statement was submitted and received approval. On August 17, 2026, the IBR program released a request for qualifications.

== Proposed design ==
As of August 2026, the replacement bridge will include the following overall design choices:

- Fixed span 116ft above water level
  - Modifications to all current interchanges between N Victory Boulevard (Portland) and SR-500 (Vancouver), necessitated by bridge height
- Auxiliary lanes, to relieve congestion and support safety goals
  - Likely one per direction; possibly two
- Twin northbound and southbound bridges
- Replacement of a separate bridge connecting Hayden Island to mainland Portland
  - Narrowing of the existing interchange, such that the Interstate Bridge only serves traffic entering from Washington
- MAX Yellow Line extension to Evergreen Boulevard
  - Three light rail stations: on Hayden Island, on the Vancouver waterfront, and at Evergreen Boulevard

Funding will occur in phases, with only Phase 1 currently funded. This phase will include replacement of the bridge itself, but not interchange upgrades or light rail construction. Since tolling on the current bridge will be used as a funding source, Phase 1 will also include construction of tolling infrastructure for the current bridge.

== History ==
=== Planning the design process (2017–2020) ===
Replacement efforts began with the Columbia River Crossing (CRC) project, which failed in 2013 when the Washington State Senate failed to approve funding for the project. Efforts were revived in 2017 when the Washington legislature created the Joint Oregon-Washington Legislative Action Committee by the Washington legislature, which Oregon joined in 2018.

The new committee was formed to prevent $140 million in federal funding allocated for the CRC from being recalled after a deadline, which was extended to 2025. In April 2019, the Washington legislature approved $17.5 million to establish a project office to conduct pre-design and planning work, which was followed by a matching contribution from the Oregon Transportation Commission in August.

The relaunched Interstate Bridge Replacement Program is a joint effort between ODOT, WSDOT, Federal Highway Administration, Federal Transit Administration, Metro, Southwest Washington Regional Transportation Council, the cities of Portland and Vancouver, the Port of Portland, and the Port of Vancouver USA.

A new timeline for the project, with the start of environmental review in 2020 and construction by 2025, was approved by the joint committee in late 2019. The replacement bridge's design remained unspecified, with discussions about the inclusion of light rail, lane configurations, and investigating a third crossing all under consideration. Former Michigan Department of Transportation deputy director Greg Johnson was appointed as the bridge program administrator in June 2020, serving 5 years until his departure in December 2025.

=== Design process and federal approval ===
Several alternative ideas were proposed, including an immersed tube tunnel, a third bridge, and a bascule bridge, which was favored by the U.S. Coast Guard. A tunnel was deemed infeasible, due to costs and the difficulty of constructing a connection to Hayden Island and Vancouver's SR-14, while moveable bridge options were deemed undesirable due to cost and delays from boat traffic.

In December 2022, the project was estimated to cost $5.5 billion to $7.5 billion, with expected contributions of $1 billion each from Washington and Oregon and the rest covered by federal funding, including funds tied to the light rail component. The locally preferred alternative released in May 2022 and presented to the Oregon Legislature in April 2023 included the following design choices:

- Fixed crossing design, 116ft above water level
  - Modifications to several interchanges, due to the higher height of the bridge
- Eight lanes, in contrast to the ten lanes the CRC had proposed
  - Continued consideration of the ten lane version
- Twin northbound and southbound bridges, allowing for the construction of one at a time
- Replacement of a separate bridge connecting Hayden Island to mainland Portland
  - Narrowing of the existing interchange, such that the Interstate Bridge only serves traffic entering from Washington
- Ongoing discussion of the placement of light rail, cyclists and pedestrians on a lower deck or on additional lanes of a single deck
- Three light rail stations: on Hayden Island, on the Vancouver waterfront, and at Evergreen Boulevard

Additionally, the U.S. Coast Guard requested an alternative design with a drawbridge to preserve the clearance for river traffic, which would be lowered by 60 feet (18 m) if the locally preferred alternative was built. Construction was scheduled to begin in late 2025 or early 2026. Tolls were to be implemented on the Oregon side of the existing bridge to help fund the new bridge as it is being built.

In January 2026, the Coast Guard gave its approval for the replacement bridge to be an all-fixed-span bridge, without a movable section, at a lowered height of 116 feet (35 m). On January 7th, public records requests revealed the draft cost estimates had increased further to $13.6 billion.

On July 1, 2026 the Federal Highway Administration and the Federal Transit Administration (FTA) jointly issued an amended Record of Decision on the IBR, which sealed Phase 1 of the project to further environmental review processes under the National Environmental Policy Act (NEPA).

=== Financing and construction planning (2026–present) ===
==== Scoping Phase 1 ====
On March 17th, 2026, Washington Governor Bob Ferguson announced the project would be broken into phases, with core components of the IBR comprising Phase 1. These components included:

- Separate replacement of the currently I-5 bridge between Vancouver and Hayden Island, and the bridge from Hayden Island to mainland Portland
  - Demolition of the current bridge
- Tolling infrastructure for current and future bridge spans
- Design work (but not construction) of part of the extension of the TriMet MAX Yellow light rail line into Vancouver, terminating at the Vancouver waterfront

Later phases would include:

- Interchange replacements due to the new bridge's elevated height, at seven locations: at SR-500, Fourth Plain, Mill Plain, and C Street (SR-14) in Vancouver; and at Hayden Island, Marine Drive, and N Victory Boulevard in Portland
- Design of the light rail extension from the Vancouver waterfront to its Evergreen Boulevard terminus
- Construction of the light rail
- Widening of I-5 to include auxiliary lanes in locations other than the Interstate Bridge

The exclusion of light rail construction in Phase 1 reduced the budget shortfall of the project from $1.2 billion to $450 million, but delayed possible receipt of a necessary Federal Transit Administration grant for light rail until at least 2030 and the start of train service until at least 2036.

==== Financing and procurement ====
Construction will be funded in part by toll-backed state bonds using toll revenue from the current and future bridges. On May 22, 2026, the start of toll collection, intended to fund construction as it occurs, was further pushed back to July 1, 2028. Exact rates are to be set closer to the start date, but would initially be under $4 in three out of four planned scenarios, with increases when traffic switches to the new bridge and planned 50% discounts for low-income households. Toll revenue is expected to be around $110 million a year on the existing bridge and at least $245 million a year by 2045, with a total expected toll revenue of $1.5 billion, according to an ongoing study as of May 2026.

Following the July 2026 FTA approval, the IBR will proceed with the procurement process using the $5.6 billion (including expected tolling revenue) the program has as of August 2026, with construction expected to start in 2028. On August 17th 2026, a request for qualifications was issued for construction firms, with an expected request for proposal deadline in November and selection in mid-2027.

== Public response ==
=== Light rail ===
The extent to which light rail expansion should be included in the scope of the bridge replacement has been a point of public discourse since the start of the project. The 2022 Locally Preferred Alternative cut the light rail extension back from Clark College, as the CRC had planned

The exclusion of the Evergreen Boulevard station in Phase 1 was similarly criticized by The Urbanist and Vancouver city officials, who had only been notified of the change the day prior to Governor Ferguson's March 17th, 2026 announcement. Vancouver Mayor Anne McEnerny-Ogle criticized Ferguson for this, and the Vancouver City Council and C-TRAN board passed resolutions in April and May condemning the change of plan. Light rail advocates consider Evergreen Boulevard an important transit hub, due to connections to the The Vine and other buses, and view the planned 90ft elevation of the waterfront station as undesirably high.

=== Environmental concerns ===
In April 2022, 1000 Friends of Oregon, Front and Centered, the Disability Mobility Initiative, and The Street Trust formed Just Crossing Alliance, a coalition of local organizations aiming to push the project in a more climate-conscious and environmentally just direction. Ongoing areas of advocacy for member organizations has been to avoid expanding I-5, to measure demand based on a tolled scenario, and to generally avoid expansion of the scope of the project.

=== Costs and tolling ===
Since the start of the program, the cost estimate has increased from around $4 billion in 2020 to $6 billion in December 2022 to $13.5–15.2 billion as of 2026, in part due to the widening of the project's scope to include other highway improvements.

At a December 15, 2025 public hearing, the IBR program stated that no cost estimate was available, which Portland economist Joe Cortright claimed was false. Cortright and the Oregon Journalism Project then obtained August 15, 2025 documents stating the $13.5–15.2 billion cost estimate, which IBR first publicly acknowledged on March 17th, 2026. This led state representatives and members of the public to accuse IBR of deceiving the public, particularly given existing budget problems.

The implementation of tolling has also garnered criticism. Based on May 2026 ongoing study documents, Cortright predicted that tolling revenue would fall short due to an estimated 50,000 commuters using the I-205 bridge or working from home to avoid the I-5 bridge toll. Others view the tolls as an undue burden on low-income residents and Hayden Island businesses, many of which employ workers at close to minimum wage.
