= Kiggins =

Kiggins is an Anglicized spelling of the Irish surname Mag Uiginn, or "son of the Viking," and may refer to:

== People ==
- Bob Kiggins, outlaw and cattle rustler, killed by lawman and gunfighter Bill Standifer in 1898
- John Kiggins (1837–1914), Union Army soldier in the American Civil War who received the Medal of Honor
- John P. Kiggins (1868–1941), movie theatre magnate and former Mayor of Vancouver, Washington
- Lewis J. Kiggins, credited with naming Ohio City, Ohio in 1890

== Places ==
- Kiggins Theatre, Art Deco movie theatre named for John P. Kiggins, located in Vancouver, Washington.
- John P. and Mary Kiggins House, listed on the National Register of Historic Places
- Kiggins Bowl, an area in Leverich Park in Vancouver, Washington, named for the geographical formation of the terrain
- Kiggin, Colorado, an unincorporated community in Garfield County, Colorado

== See also ==
- Higgins (disambiguation)
- List of American Civil War Medal of Honor recipients: G-L
- List of places in Colorado: I-O
