= Leverich =

Leverich is a surname. Notable people with the surname include:

- Charles P. Leverich (1811–1880), American banker
- Frances Adelaide Leverich (died 1934), American clubwoman
- James Earl Leverich (1891–1979), American politician

== See also ==
- Leverich Park, a park in Vancouver, Washington, United States
