= Jim Justin =

53rd Mayor of Vancouver, Washington
- In office January 1, 1974 – January 1, 1984
- Preceded by: James Gallagher
- Succeeded by: Bryce Seidl

Personal details
- Born: James Godfrey Justin; November 28, 1932 Portland, Oregon, U.S.
- Died: December 7, 2009 Vancouver, Washington, U.S.
- Spouse: Janet Ruth Murphy
- Children: 3
- Education: University of Portland

Military service
- Branch/service: United States Air Force

James "Jim" Godfrey Justin (November 28, 1932 – December 7, 2009) was an American military officer and politician who served as the Mayor of Vancouver, Washington from 1974 from 1984.

== Early life and education ==
Justin was born in Portland, Oregon, and attended the University of Portland. He served for three years in the United States Air Force, retiring with the rank of colonel. While serving in the Air Force, Justin became friends with Royce Pollard, who served as Mayor of Vancouver from 1996 to 2010. Justin remained a member of the Air Force Reserve for 30 years.

== Career ==
After serving in the Air Force, Justin moved to Vancouver, Washington, where he helped his parents operate their small business, Photo Mart. Justin later sold the store and became a real estate agent for Coldwell Banker. Prior to serving as Mayor of Vancouver, Justin was a member of the Vancouver City Council.

In 1980, Justin was listed as an interested party in a feasibility study of the Columbia River Bridge, commissioned by the Federal Highway Administration. Justin also provided testimony to the United States House Committee on Transportation and Infrastructure.

== Personal life ==
Justin and his wife, Janet, had three children. Janet died in 1996. Later in his life, Justin was diagnosed with kidney dialysis and suffered a heart attack in 2007. He died on December 7, 2009, at the age of 77.
