= W. Byron Daniels =

American politician

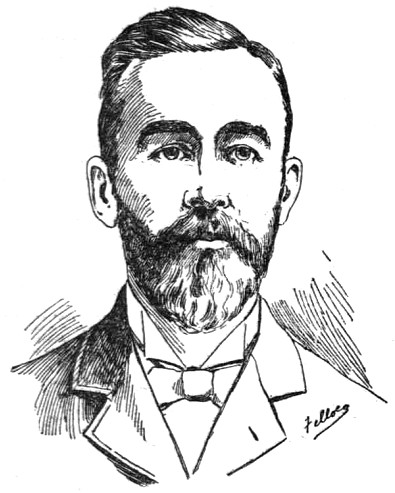

15th Mayor of Vancouver, Washington
- In office January 1, 1891 – January 1, 1894
- Preceded by: J. R. Smith
- Succeeded by: G. W. Stapleton

Personal details
- Born: William Byron Daniels Jr. December 17, 1848 Mentor, Ohio, U.S.
- Died: October 3, 1900 (aged 51) Vancouver, Washington, U.S.
- Party: Republican
- Relations: William B. Daniels (father)

W. Byron Daniels (December 17, 1848 – October 3, 1900) was an American politician, lawyer, and newspaper publisher in Vancouver, Washington Territory.

== Early life ==
Byron Daniels born William Byron Daniels Jr., one of four sons of William B. Daniels. Byron Daniels was born in Mentor, Ohio, on December 17, 1848, on a farm. In 1854, his family came across the plains in a covered wagon on the Oregon Trail to Yamhill County, Oregon Territory. Byron was educated in public schools in the area, and became a teacher in Oregon City, Oregon.

== Career ==
In 1869, he moved to Vancouver, Washington Territory and began studying law with A. G. Cook and Henry G. Struve. In 1872, he was admitted to the bar in Olympia, Washington Territory. After serving for a while as private secretary to Washington Territory Governor Elisha Peyre Ferry, he left to become a surveyor in Idaho, Oregon, and California, and worked on land abstracts in San Francisco. In the surveying party were a number of persons that later became prominent in the Northwest, and continued as friends in politics. In 1875, he returned to Vancouver and started a law practice.

=== Newspaper publishing ===
In addition to his law practice, Byron Daniels started a newspaper, The Vancouver Independent. He was both the publisher and the editor for this weekly local newspaper. The paper's banner stated "Here Shall the Press the People’s Rights Maintain, Unawed by Influence, Unbribed by Gain" in testament to the independence sought by Daniels. Previous local papers had been outspoken in support of various sides in local and national issues. The Vancouver Independent began as a four-page weekly, published on Saturdays.

It boasted in an advertisement that it was the "official paper of three counties, and the only paper published in the seven counties of the Vancouver Land district of which it was the official paper." Being the "official paper" meant that the local governments would use the paper for legal announcements. The "Vancouver Land district" was the jurisdiction for the local area of the United States Land Office. In 1877 the circulation was estimated to be 520, which is significant, if true, as the census population in 1880 for Clark County Washington was 5,490. In 1878, Daniels sold the newspaper to his brother, Thurston Daniels, and John Beeson. Beeson served as editor and proprietor for the newspaper until 1894, when he sold it to Robert Lewis "Lloyd" DuBois. The paper was eventually closed in 1910 and its subscription rolls sold to The Columbian.

=== Civic leadership ===
In 1877, Byron Daniels was elected as a Republican to the Washington Territorial House of Representatives, representing Clarke County. Daniels was also elected to the Territory's First Constitutional Convention in 1878, where he was elected the convention's secretary. Returning from the Territorial Convention in 1878, Byron Daniels became chairman of the Republican Central Committee for Clarke County, a position he served actively for a number of years. In 1879, Daniels was elected to the Vancouver City Council, and the Council appointed him city attorney. In 1883, Daniels joined Louis Sohns as officers of the Northwestern Railroad and Improvement Co., with Sohns as president and Daniels as secretary. Along with several other leading Vancouver businessmen, this group was working to bring railroads to the Vancouver area.

In 1891, Daniels was appointed by the Vancouver City Council to be the 15th mayor of Vancouver, filling a vacancy left by J. R. Smith. In 1892, the electorate elected Daniels to a second term based on popular approval of his previous administration. Based on his early teaching career, in 1876, Daniels was appointed the superintendent of schools in Clarke County. Daniels was frequently involved in many committees and efforts to improve education in Vancouver and Clark County. Daniels also served in 1891 as a trustee for the Washington State School for Defective Youth (later renamed and split into the Washington School for the Blind and the Washington School for the Deaf).

== Personal life ==
The Daniels family was well-known in the Pacific Northwest, with William B. Daniels known as "the Governor" from having served as Territorial Governor for Idaho, and Byron Daniels' brothers Thurston Daniels, Horace Daniels, and Hubert Daniels. The Daniels family were members of St. Luke's Episcopal Church, with Byron Daniels serving on the church Vestry. W. Byron Daniels married Rosina A. Jaggy on January 18, 1883. They had two daughters, Marguerite Daniels and Lucile Daniels. Mr. and Mrs. Daniels built a prominent house in Vancouver on Main Street, between 9th and 10th Streets. He died on October 3, 1900, in Vancouver, Washington.
