= Tim Leavitt =

American politician

Timothy D. Leavitt
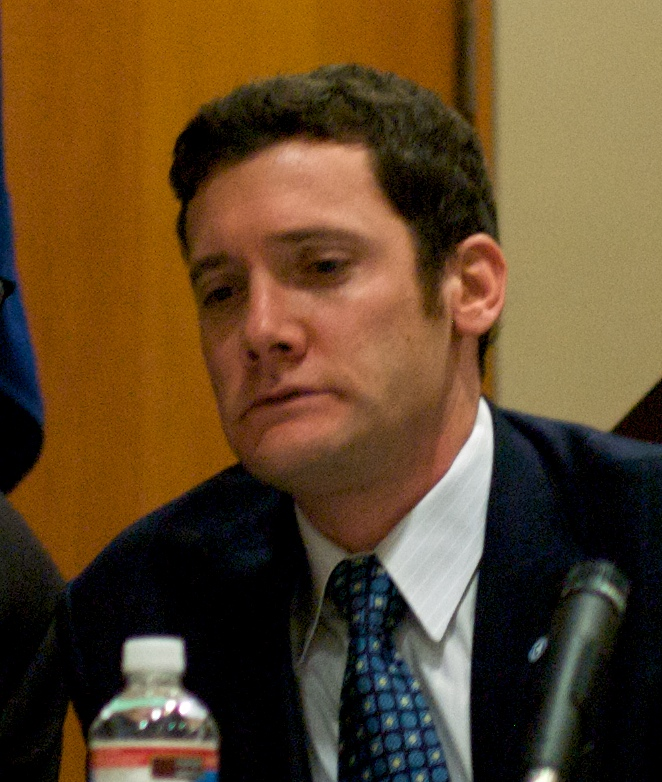

57th Mayor of Vancouver, Washington
- In office January 1, 2010 – January 1, 2018
- Preceded by: Royce Pollard
- Succeeded by: Anne McEnerny-Ogle

Personal details
- Born: 1971 (age 54–55) Yakima, Washington, U.S.
- Party: Democratic
- Education: Clark College (AS); Washington State University (BS, MS)

Timothy D. Leavitt (born 1971) is an American politician who served as the mayor of Vancouver, Washington. He was first elected in 2009 when he defeated 14-year incumbent Royce Pollard.

== Early life and education ==
Leavitt was born in Yakima, Washington and has lived in Clark County, Washington since 1980. After graduating from Fort Vancouver High School, he earned an Associate's degree in pre-engineering from Clark College and a Bachelor of Science degree in civil engineering and Master of Science degree in environmental engineering, both from Washington State University. Leavitt was a member of Alpha Kappa Lambda fraternity.

== Career ==
Since 1998, Leavitt has worked for civil and environmental engineering firm PBS Engineering + Environmental.

In January 2003, Leavitt was appointed to the Vancouver City Council to fill a vacancy and was elected to the seat in November of that year, 2003. While on the Council, Leavitt also served on the board of directors of C-Tran, including acting as its chair for several years.

In January, 2010 he succeeded 14-year mayor Royce Pollard after winning the 2009 election by nine percentage points. Most attribute the upset of Pollard's decade-plus dominance of the city's mayoral politics to an election divided over whether tolling will be used to pay for replacement of the Interstate Bridge, with Leavitt opposing tolls for Vancouver residents.

Shortly after he was elected, Leavitt revealed that the battle against tolls "is not winnable," and changed his stance. Leavitt was sworn in on January 4, 2010.

In late 2011, there was some speculation that Leavitt would run against Jaime Herrera Beutler for the 3rd congressional district in the United States House of Representatives in 2012. In November, he released a statement saying, "After much conversation, advice/feedback and deliberation, I've decided now is not the right time for me, for our city council and for our community to pursue the WA 3rd Congressional District seat."

In 2013, Leavitt ran for reelection, opposed by City Councilor Bill Turlay. While Leavitt was endorsed by The Columbian and unions representing city employees, local firefighters, and others, Turlay was endorsed by the Clark County Republican Party. In the November election, Leavitt beat Turlay, 53% to 47%.

Leavitt was succeeded as mayor by Anne McEnerny-Ogle in January 2018.

== See also ==
- List of mayors of Vancouver, Washington
