= Columbia River Crossing =

Proposed bridge in Oregon and Washington, USA

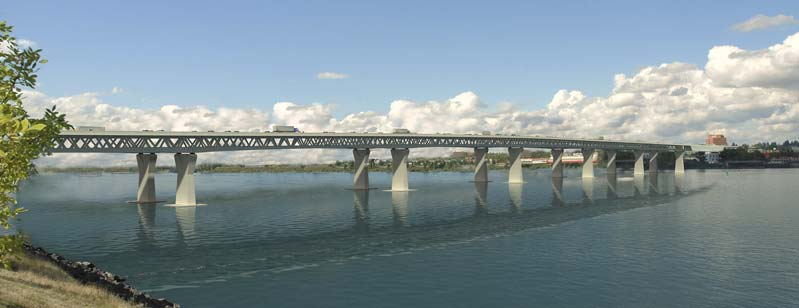
- Conceptual illustration for a possible deck truss bridge, seen from the southeast
- Coordinates: 45°37′N 122°41′W
- Carries: Interstate 5
- Crosses: Columbia River
- Locale: Oregon, Washington
- Named for: Columbia River
- Preceded by: Interstate Bridge

History
- Construction cost: $175 million
- Opened: Never opened

Location
- Interactive map of Columbia River Crossing

The Columbia River Crossing (CRC) was a proposed joint freeway megaproject from 2005 to 2013 between Oregon and Washington, which proposed to widen and modernize Interstate 5 where it crossed the Columbia River. Central to this was the replacement of the Interstate Bridge, a pair of through-truss bridges. The northbound bridge dates to 1917, and its nearly identical companion was opened in 1958 to carry southbound traffic. The bridges, the earlier of which pre-dates the U.S. Highway System by nine years, served as the crossing for U.S. Route 99 before the establishment of the Interstate Highway System and Interstate 5 as the new route number. Each of the current bridges currently has three traffic lanes and no emergency lanes. Each bridge also has a vertical-lift draw bridge span on the Washington State side of the river to allow shipping traffic access upriver.

The CRC was intended to be a safer, more modern bridge, with greater capacity, including light rail to directly connect with the regional MAX system. It would also have replaced or modified seven freeway interchanges south of SR-500. "Project partners" included the Federal Highway Administration and the Federal Transit Administration, cities of Vancouver and Portland, the Southwest Washington Regional Transportation Council, Metro, and transit agencies C-Tran and TriMet. Other agencies were involved as part of "task forces," but the project was blocked July 2013 by Republican opposition within the Washington State Senate.

== Proposal ==
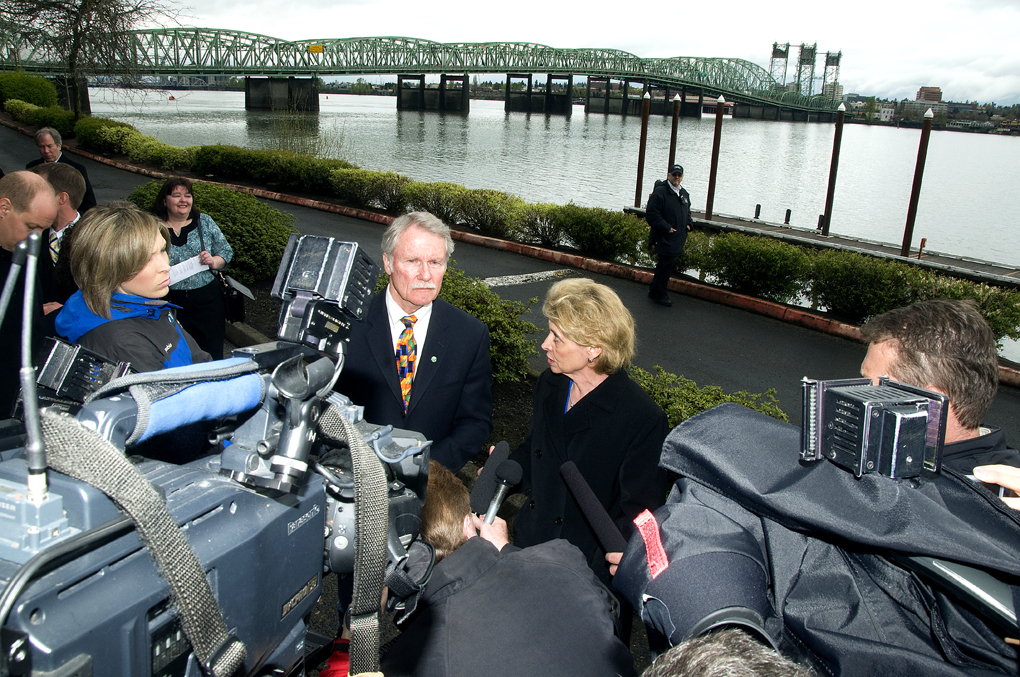
At an April 25, 2011, news conference in front of the Interstate Bridge, Washington Governor Christine Gregoire and Oregon Governor John Kitzhaber announced their plan for the project in 2013.

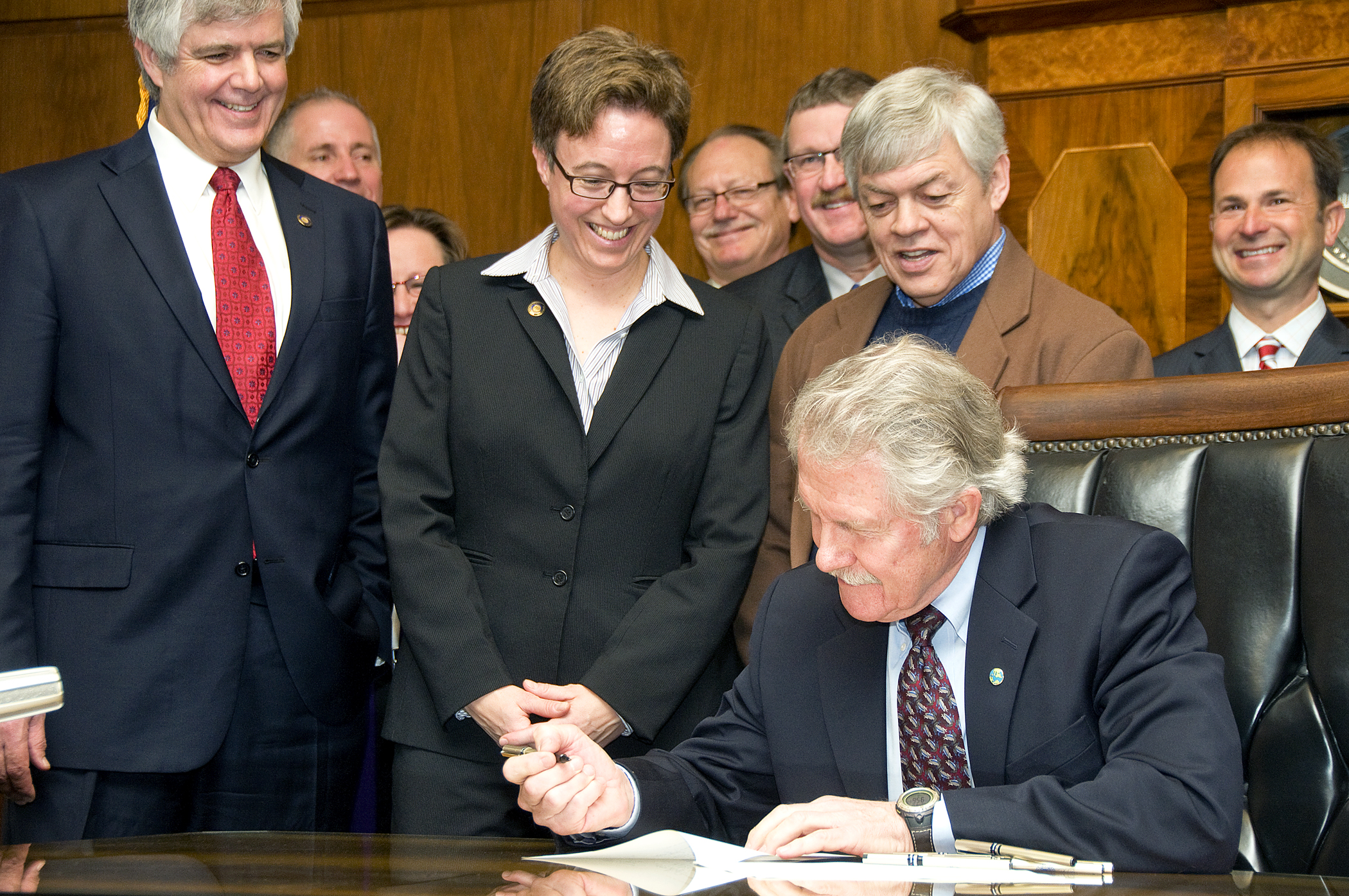
Oregon Governor John Kitzhaber signs HB2800, authorizing funding for the project. Looking on is Congressman Cliff Bentz (then State Representative), Governor Tina Kotek (then Speaker of the House), and others

A draft environmental impact statement (EIS) was published in May 2008, with a final EIS published in the Federal Register on September 23, 2011. While first said to begin in 2010, the CRC team later said construction would not begin until late 2014. The EIS was produced at a cost of $105 million, over five times the original estimate, and was delivered 18 months behind schedule. The ongoing project planning costs $1 million per month. Planners say the construction phase would last five to seven years. Official cost estimates for a phased build-out were $2.8 billion, down from earlier estimates of $3.5 billion. The CRC finance plan called for tolling to pay for up to $1.3 billion of the cost.

== Opposition ==
In May 2011, a critic estimated a range of probable cost of $3.1 to $10 billion for five miles of highway and transit work, to include a double-deck truss bridge with ten lanes for auto traffic on the top deck, with public transportation, bicycles and pedestrians below. Concerns about the tolling plan have been raised by state treasurers of both Oregon and Washington. A report by Oregon Treasurer Ted Wheeler found that "key assumptions in the traffic and toll revenue forecast used in the 2008 [Draft Environmental Impact Statement] are now outdated", and says that tolling will result in up to $598 million less than predicted earlier. The report cited problems raised by two independent studies. While the CRC predicts ever increasing traffic, Robert Bain of London firm RB Consult Ltd. calls that into question, noting that "traffic volumes using the I-5 Bridge have flattened-off over the last 15-20 years; well before the current recessionary period. The clear inference is that the flattening-off is a long-term traffic trend; not simply a manifestation of recent circumstances". A second consulting firm said that "employment growth projections by IHS Global Insight and by Moody's Analytics are significantly lower than those utilized in the [Draft Environmental Impact Statement] process". Traffic leveling off and employment growth less than half that predicted by the CRC combine to cause problems with the finance plan.

A 2012 survey found that 52% of Portland drivers and 77% of Clark County drivers would divert to I-205 to avoid paying a toll on I-5. The Sightline Institute says that tolling should begin immediately so that planners have real-world data on how many trips would divert to I-205 to avoid an I-5 toll.

Oregon Governor John Kitzhaber introduced a bill for the 2013 legislature (H.B. 2260) which gives the state authority to raise money for the project via tolling; in the bill the project is referred to as "The Interstate 5 Bridge Replacement Program" rather than the CRC, a rebranding noted by local and national journalists.

The CRC megaproject was subject to at least three lawsuits. Thompson Metal Fab in Vancouver sued over the limited bridge height which they say will hurt their company's competitiveness. Residents of Hayden Island filed suit, claiming failure to properly examine negative air quality impacts and impacts to low income residents (some living as close as 50 feet from the project). The Coalition for a Livable Future, Northeast Coalition of Neighborhoods, and Northwest Environmental Defense Center challenged the federal agencies [FHWA and FTA] responsible for the CRC megaproject, based on concerns that the megaproject failed to consider even a basic analysis of key environmental issues, and said that the CRC failed to include a reasonable range of alternatives, instead creating a false choice between two extremes.

If built, the construction on Hayden Island was expected to last over five years, and impacts would include the forcible acquisition and demolition of 35 floating homes, along with 39 businesses employing 600 people.

== Termination ==
Of approximately $227 million allocated, the project had spent $175 million by the end of April 2013, much of it on pre-construction testing of subsurface conditions, which may or may not be useful in the future. The project was terminated after the Washington State Senate failed to approve $450 million in funding, with key opponent Ann Rivers of La Center, Washington suggesting alternative measures such as eliminating lane changes and lowering the speed limit on the bridge. One common objection from opponents was the inclusion of light rail.

== Revival attempts ==
In August 2013 a group of business leaders and other submitted a proposal to governors Inslee and Kitzhaber which would reduce total cost to $2.75 billion, avoiding the need for Washington's immediate contribution by eliminating modifications to all but one interchange north of the river. In September, Oregon Governor John Kitzhaber made a proposal to the Oregon State Legislature for them to consider an Oregon-led project, which the Oregon Department of Justice found legal. Treasurer Ted Wheeler noted that any progress was likely dependent on an acceptable tolling plan, light-rail operational funding and Coast Guard approval and two of these were approved within days.

Although there was not a special legislative session to consider the proposal, they appointed a 24-member committee to review a "revised, Oregon-only plan."

On March 7, the Oregon Legislature adjourned without reinstating construction funds for the CRC I-5 Bridge Replacement project. The project office was officially closed down on May 31, 2014, with related documents and plans archived in case the project is ever revived.

=== Interstate Bridge Replacement Program ===
A revived project, the Interstate Bridge Replacement Program, was launched in 2017. The Joint Oregon-Washington Legislative Action Committee was formed by the Washington legislature in 2017 to study a bridge replacement, but initially had no Oregon representation for a year. The new committee was formed to prevent $140 million in federal funding allocated for the CRC from being recalled after a deadline, which was extended to 2025. In April 2019, the Washington legislature approved $17.5 million to establish a project office to conduct pre-design and planning work, which was followed by a matching contribution from the Oregon Transportation Commission in August.

A new timeline for the project, with the start of environmental review in 2020 and construction by 2025, was approved by the joint committee in late 2019.
