= Gay Hayden =

American pioneer

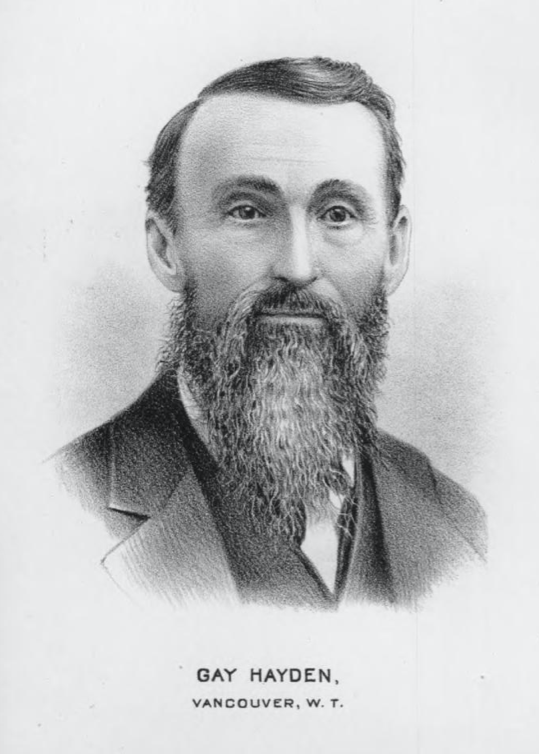
- Born: Gay S B Hayden; April 9, 1819; Oneida County, New York, United States
- Died: May 14, 1902 (aged 83); Clark County, Washington, United States
- Known for: Hayden Island
- Spouses: Linda Ruth Hayden (m. 1841) Mary Jane Hayden (m. 1847–1886)
- Children: 6

Gay Hayden (April 9, 1819 – May 14, 1902) was a prominent Oregon pioneer who owned a significant portion of what is now the city of Vancouver including properties previously owned by Esther Short. Additionally, Hayden owned all of or part of what is now Hayden Island in Portland, Oregon, which is named in his memory.

Hayden arrived in the Oregon Territory in 1850 with his wife Mary Jane Hayden, whom he met in the wilds of Wisconsin and married in 1847. In 1851, after settling on what would become known today as Hayden Island, he built a grand home and lived on the island for five years with his wife Mary Jane Hayden. On March 10, 1886, Gay Hayden and Mary Jane Hayden separated and divided their property in court, from that point on each handling their own real estate and financial affairs. Hayden died intestate in May 1902.
