= John P. Kiggins =

American politician

John Phillip Kiggins (October 3, 1868 – May 21, 1941) was an American politician and movie theater magnate who served as mayor of Vancouver, Washington for four non-consecutive terms.

Kiggins was born in Nashville, Tennessee, but eventually moved to Vancouver, and with the exception of his service in the Army during the Spanish–American War, and a few years following that in Alaska, Kiggins made Vancouver his home until his death.

Kiggins was first elected as Mayor in 1909, and finished his final term in office in 1938. Numerous landmarks in Vancouver bear his name, most notably the athletic facilities at Leverich Park, which are known as Kiggins Bowl. Additionally, Kiggins Theatre in downtown Vancouver was the final movie theater built by John P. Kiggins, and is still operating today. His home, later named the John P. and Mary Kiggins House, was built in 1907 and added to the National Register of Historic Places in 1995.
