= Kiggins Theatre =

Single-screen theatre in Vancouver, WA, USA

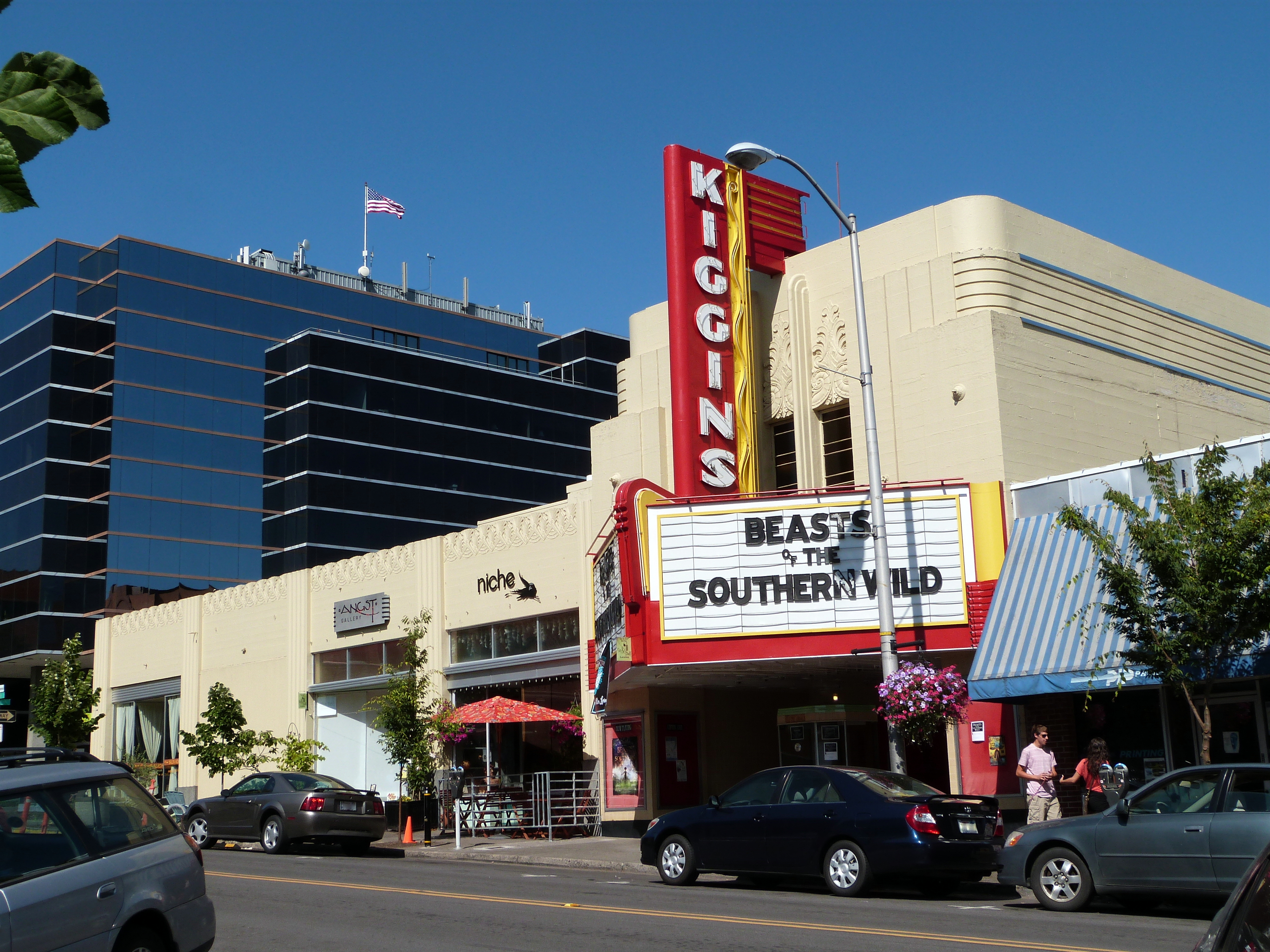
- The Kiggins Theatre in 2012.
- Interactive map of Kiggins Theatre
- Address: 1011 Main St. Vancouver, Washington
- Capacity: 340 seats
- Type: Cinema

Construction
- Opened: 1936
- Architect: Day Walter Hilborn

Website
- kigginstheatre.com
- Kiggins Theater
- U.S. National Register of Historic Places
- Coordinates: 45.62926°N 122.67132°W
- Built: 1936
- Architectural style: Art Deco
- NRHP reference No.: 12000421
- Added to NRHP: July 17, 2012

The Kiggins Theatre is an historic, single-screen movie theater in Vancouver, Washington. Named for former Vancouver mayor and businessman John P. Kiggins, it opened in 1936. It is located at 1011 Main Street in downtown Vancouver.

== Architecture ==
The Kiggins Theatre was designed in the Art Deco style by architect Day Walter Hilborn. The walls were constructed using formed concrete, with decorative motifs on the exterior and interior. The "Kiggins" neon sign is original, as are some of the interior light fixtures. The original marquee was replaced in the late 1950s. An elaborate mural originally painted inside the building no longer exists.

== History ==
Construction of the Kiggins Theatre began on September 20, 1935. The theater opened on April 24, 1936, with a showing of the film She Married Her Boss, starring Claudette Colbert and Melvyn Douglas.

The Kiggins operated continuously as a movie theater from 1936 to 1955. In 1958, the interior and exterior of the theater were renovated; the current marquee was installed at that time. The Kiggins reopened as part of the Adamson Theaters chain, which ran the theater for the next two decades. In 1980, the theater was acquired by a local church, and stopped showing commercial movies in favor of Christian films. The theater sustained moderate smoke and water damage after an electrical fire in 1981 and remained closed for nearly two years. After repairs and some renovation, the Kiggins reopened in 1983 and began showing second run double features through 1996. The theater was renovated again in early 1997, when some architectural features were restored, and more modern projection and sound equipment were installed. The theater reopened under new management in May 1997, and operated until May 2010, when it closed once again because of financial difficulties.

The Kiggins was renovated and reopened under new management in September 2011. It was added to the National Register of Historic Places in 2012.
