= Covington House (Vancouver, Washington) =

Historical cabin in Vancouver, Washington, U.S.

- U.S. National Register of Historic Places
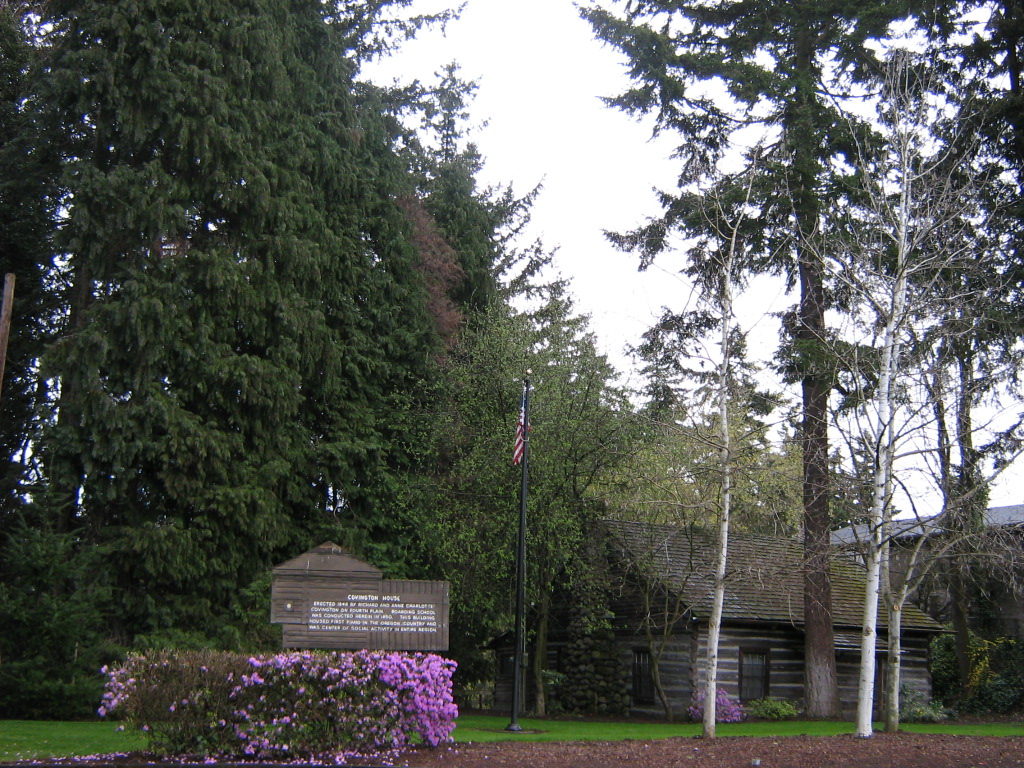

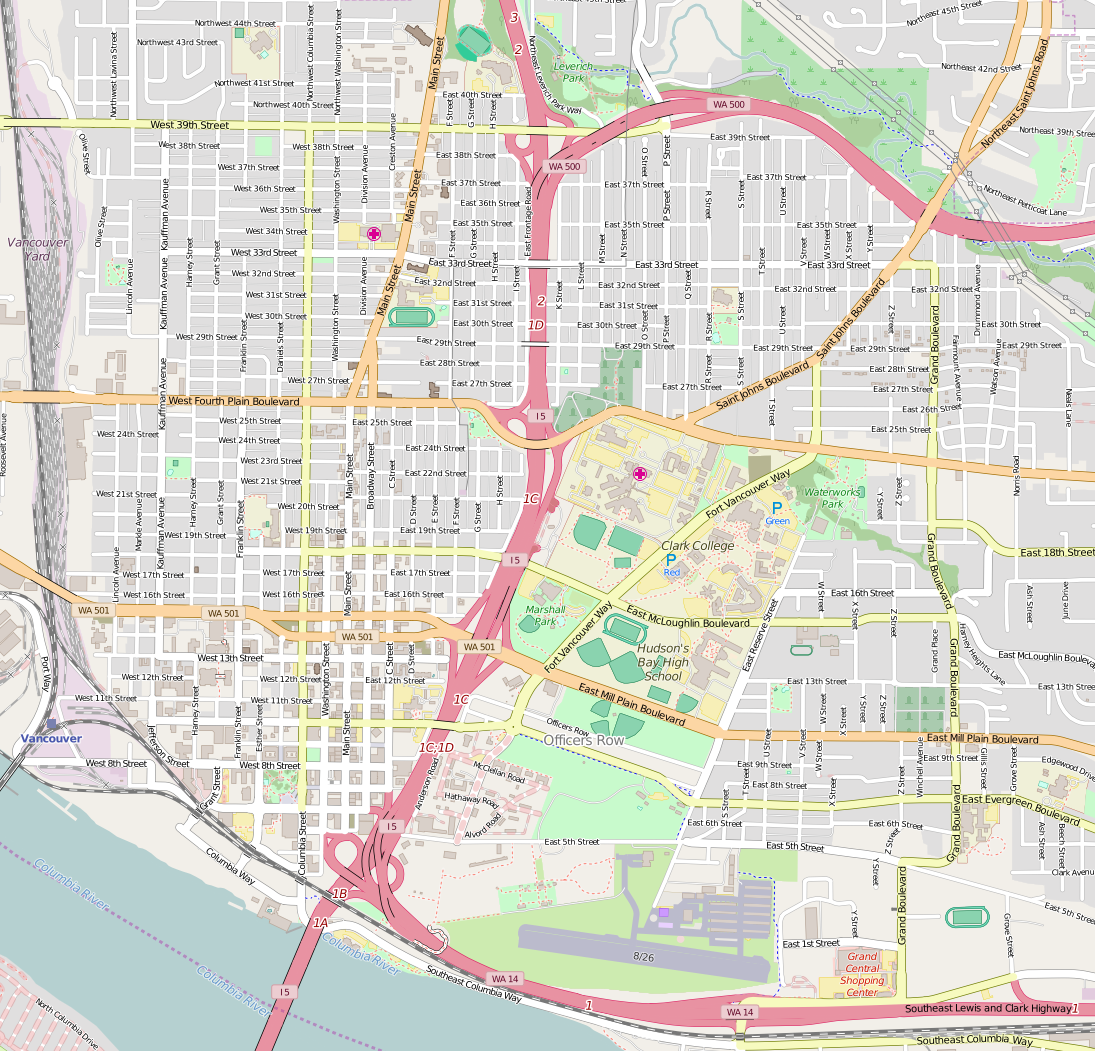
- Location within Vancouver Washington
- Location: 4201 Main Street, Vancouver, Washington
- Coordinates: 45°39′09″N 122°39′59″W
- Area: less than one acre
- Built: 1846–1848
- Architect: Richard Covington
- Architectural style: log house
- Website: covingtonhistorichouse.com
- NRHP reference No.: 72001268
- Added to NRHP: 5 May 1972

The Covington House historic cabin in Vancouver, Washington, was built by Richard and Charlotte "Anna" Covington born, raised and married in London, England who travelled by ship around Cape Horn, stopping at the Sandwich Islands (now known as The Hawaiian Islands) and finally arriving at Fort Vancouver in the Oregon Territory, where they had been hired to teach children of the Hudson's Bay Company employees. The first three "plains" of the area were held by Hudson Bay Fur Trade Co. whereas the fourth "plain" was opened up for public sale as property north of the Columbia River became part of the United States, the government gave newly acquired land to early pioneers, willing to settle and farm the land. The Covingtons taught at the Fort immediately after their arrival, 1846 until 11 April 1848 when they entered "donation land claim" No. 43 640 acres (2.6 km^{2}) in the Fourth Plain area, the community now referred to as Orchards, where they built their home, House No. 16 and Boarding School, per the 1850 census. Although they never had any of their own children, the couple established a boarding school in addition to operating a large fruit farm, called the Kalsus Farm. The children slept in the cabin loft, as it was an arduous seven – eight-mile trek, one way, north east of the Fort and wrought with danger for small children to attempt to travel alone. The Covington's log cabin soon became known as the social center of hospitality with musical entertainment in the early days of Vancouver on the Columbia River. Besides his guitar, they also brought a violin and the first piano to the Pacific Northwest as well, they also taught music to many of these local children at that time. Richard Covington was extremely talented, in addition to building their log cabin home, and developing an expansive orchard, he served in several offices as a justice of the peace, county clerk, school superintendent, cartographer, artist, musician, vocalist, and briefly as a ranger during an "Indian uprising" First Nations/Native Americans.

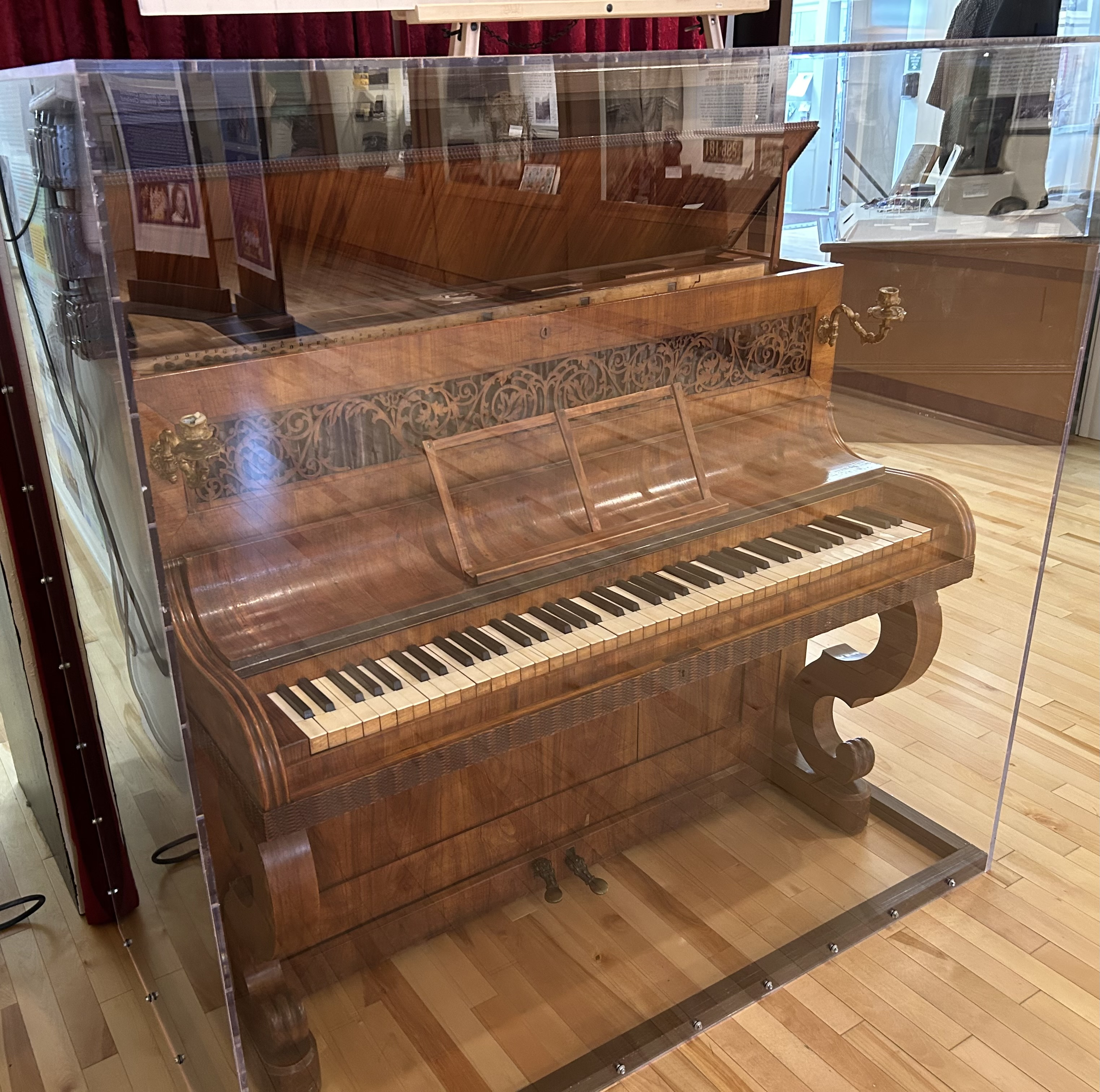
The Covington's piano on display at the Clark County Historical Museum

The inscription on the marker in front of the cabin reads: "Erected 1848 by Richard and Anne Charlotte Covington on Fourth Plain. Boarding school was conducted herein in 1850. This building housed first piano in the Oregon Country and was center of social activity in entire region".

U.S. Army Captain and future President Ulysses S. Grant was quartermaster at what was then known as Columbia Barracks at Fort Vancouver for 15 months beginning in September 1852 – 1853. During this time, he was known to ride 7–8 miles by horseback to visit the Covington home, to enjoy some semblance of familial life.

Richard Covington was elected Clark County school superintendent in 1862 and 1863. In 1867 he received an appointment to work in the United States Patent Office, under the administration of their friend and then President of the United States Ulysses S. Grant, so they sold their farm, in January, to William C. Hazard for $2,100 and moved to Washington, D.C. At the time of their departure, they gave their piano to a friend who eventually gave it to Nan Maynard Rice years later. In 1967, Miss Rice donated the piano to the Clark County Historical Museum. The Covingtons stayed in Washington, DC through President Grant's term in office, then temporarily spent time in Victoria, British Columbia until retiring to the Sandwich Islands until Richards death. It is believed that Anna returned to England.

The Covington House cabin, which is the oldest (domestic dwelling/home) privately built structure, is also the oldest school building in addition to it being the oldest boarding school built in Clark County, Washington. Circa 1925, it was "rediscovered" by local businessmen, who came together to raise attention and funds needed to save and restore the cabin. Which at that time not only was being used to house farm animals, but was "in advanced stage of disrepair – barren and weathered, open windows and doors, and unkempt shingles, dispiritedly in part of a weed-grown lot". Circa 1926–28, the individually adze hewn logs of the cabin were numbered and catalogued, disassembled, and relocated at its present site, 4201 Main Street, where it stands today. At that time that was the northwest corner of Leverich Park, (in an area called Kiggins Bowl due to the shape of the terrain), facing the old Pacific Highway, before being separated from the Park by the development of the "new" freeway, Interstate 5. Several modifications were added during this major restoration and relocation project, including electricity, heat, lights, water and plumbing, wooden floor, a new unique fireplace boasting large local river stones and single piece of local timber for the new fireplace and mantle, new windows, a kitchen, two restrooms and a fully restored roof with wooden rain gutters. The location was distinctive as being on the old Pacific Highway, and facing the old "Vancouver Column" adjacent to the oldest and now the newest (due to removal, restoration and re-dedication of the) Blue Star Memorial Highway Marker, in the state of Washington.

The Covington House itself is currently owned and maintained by the city of Vancouver on land owned by the local school district and managed by the Vancouver Woman's Society affiliated with GFWC The General Federation of Woman's Clubs. The house had served as a home, a farm and a boarding school, and quickly became a social hub. As it was in the beginning, so it is now, the cabin continues to provide a special place for special events as well as being utilized by many local groups as a regular meeting place. Because the cabin is a National Landmark, it is available to view by the public, by appointment.

== Historic Registry ==
- Listed on the National Register of Historic Places 5 May 1972.
- Listed on the Clark County Heritage Register in 1985.
