= Mary Jane Hayden =

American pioneer

Mary J. Hayden (born Mary Jane Bean; 1830 in Athens, Maine) spent her early childhood with her grandparents in the town of Cornville, Maine. In 1845, Hayden emigrated with her parents to the wilds of Wisconsin, where in 1847, she met and married Gay Hayden. In 1850, they emigrated to the Oregon Territory and settled in what is now Vancouver, Washington. In 1851, upon hearing of the Donation Land Claim Act, a year after the act was passed by Congress, they settled on an island situated on the Columbia River between modern-day Portland, Oregon, and Vancouver, Washington that would become known as Hayden Island. Gay Hayden proceeded to build a grand home and live on the island for five years with his wife and their twin children. Together and individually, they would both become well-known pioneers of the Pacific Northwest. Hayden was a member of the Oregon Pioneer Association. She died on June 24, 1918, in Seattle, Washington.

== Hayden v. Zerbst ==
On March 10, 1886, Hayden separated from her husband and divided their property in court, from that point on each handling their own real estate and financial affairs. Gay Hayden later sold a portion of his land to Terrence Furey in September 1901, and Furey (prior to the purchase of the lot) was informed that Hayden was the wife of the grantor but that she had no interest in the lot. Furey then resold the land on March 8, 1906, to Reinhold Zerbst, but Hayden did not join in this conveyance. Furey sold and conveyed the lot to Zerbst, who at said time did not know that Gay Hayden was a married man. Gay Hayden had died almost four years previously intestate in Clarke County in May 1902 and his estate was probated in that county.

The Portland and Seattle Railway had Zerbst's land condemned in 1903 and he was subsequently reimbursed $1200 for the land. Hayden had made no claim to this lot until the sale to Zerbst was begun upon which she appealed to the Supreme Court of Washington in 1908 for her half of the proceeds from said land sale and resulted in the case of Hayden v. Zerbst. In the end, the court found in favor of Zerbst as Hayden had not taken any action for 14 years after the sale of the land by her late husband.
