= William B. Daniels =

American politician

William Daniels

Acting Governor of the Idaho Territory
- In office December 1, 1863 – February 26, 1864
- Preceded by: William H. Wallace
- Succeeded by: Caleb Lyon

1st Secretary of the Territory of Idaho
- In office March 10, 1863 – July 4, 1864
- Appointed by: Abraham Lincoln
- Preceded by: Position created
- Succeeded by: C. DeWitt Smith

Personal details
- Born: November 1, 1817; Mentor, Ohio, U.S.
- Died: April 21, 1894; Tacoma, Washington, U.S.
- Political party: Republican
- Children: 4, including W. Byron Daniels

William B. Daniels (November 1, 1817 – April 21, 1894) was an American farmer, lawyer, politician, and early settler of the Oregon Territory who served as secretary of state of Idaho and acting governor of Idaho Territory.

== Early life ==
William Daniels was born in Mentor, Ohio in 1817 to parents Aaron and Anna Daniels, who were farmers. William Daniels, his wife Sarah, and their four sons migrated to Yamhill County in what was then the Oregon Territory in 1854. They were some of the earliest American settlers in the Territory, crossing the plains of the Oregon Trail in a covered wagon. In Oregon, in addition to continuing his farming, Daniels studied the law and became a practicing lawyer. He quickly became involved in local Republican Party politics.

== Career ==
=== Idaho Territory ===
Upon the creation of the Idaho Territory in 1863, President Abraham Lincoln appointed the Territory's first Governor, William H. Wallace, and the Territory's first Secretary (Secretary of State), Daniels, on March 10, 1863. Both were active Republican supporters of Lincoln. Wallace was a personal friend of Lincoln's (and subsequently a pallbearer for Lincoln) and a lawyer from Washington Territory. Daniels was also a lawyer from the now state of Oregon. They arrived in Idaho Territory on July 10, 1863, to a contentious public environment, with mining interests set against farming and ranching interests, northern state supporters against southern state supporters. Governor Wallace called for an election on October 31, 1863. Wallace decided to run for the position of Territorial Delegate to the United States House of Representatives, a position he had previously held for the Washington Territory. Wallace promised to resign the Idaho Territory governorship should he be elected a delegate to the Congress. He was elected despite a strong Democratic showing. In December 1863, the new Territorial Legislature met with William B. Daniels as both the secretary and the acting governor of the Territory. In his inaugural address, Governor Daniels said in part:

Shall Idaho, the largest of the territories, take her stand in sympathy with a cause (slavery) so vile, and cloud the morning of her existence with the darkness of treason? No, let her, as her name indicates, sit among the mountains, a gem of the brightest luster, radiant with unconditional loyalty, attracting by her glorious light the gaze and admiration of mankind.

Political sentiment quickly shifted from Republican to Democratic Party support, and as the Territory soon became overwhelmingly-Democratic, due to a large immigration to the mining camps from Missouri and other Southern States. The Territory was not represented in Congress by a Republican for the next two decades. Some local newspapers also turned against Daniels, particularly the Golden Age newspaper in Lewiston. Daniels had given the newspaper all government printing contracts, but wanted to buy the newspaper in order to get an outlet for the administration's political opinions. The owner, Frank Kenyon instead sold the paper to Alonzo Leland, a prominent opponent. The paper began a heavy attack on Daniels, and the acting governor retaliated by pulling all the printing contracts from the newspaper. Daniels soon resigned and returned to Oregon.

Upon returning to Oregon from the Idaho Territory, Daniels practiced law and was a local businessman in Columbia County, Oregon.

== Personal life ==
William B. Daniels was married to Sarah Hall, and they had four sons: W. Byron Daniels, George Hubert Daniels, Horace G. Daniels, and Thurston L. Daniels. All were prominent in Oregon and Washington states. He died April 21, 1894, in Tacoma, Washington, and is buried in Vancouver, Washington.
