= John P. and Mary Kiggins House =

Historic house in Washington, United States

- U.S. National Register of Historic Places
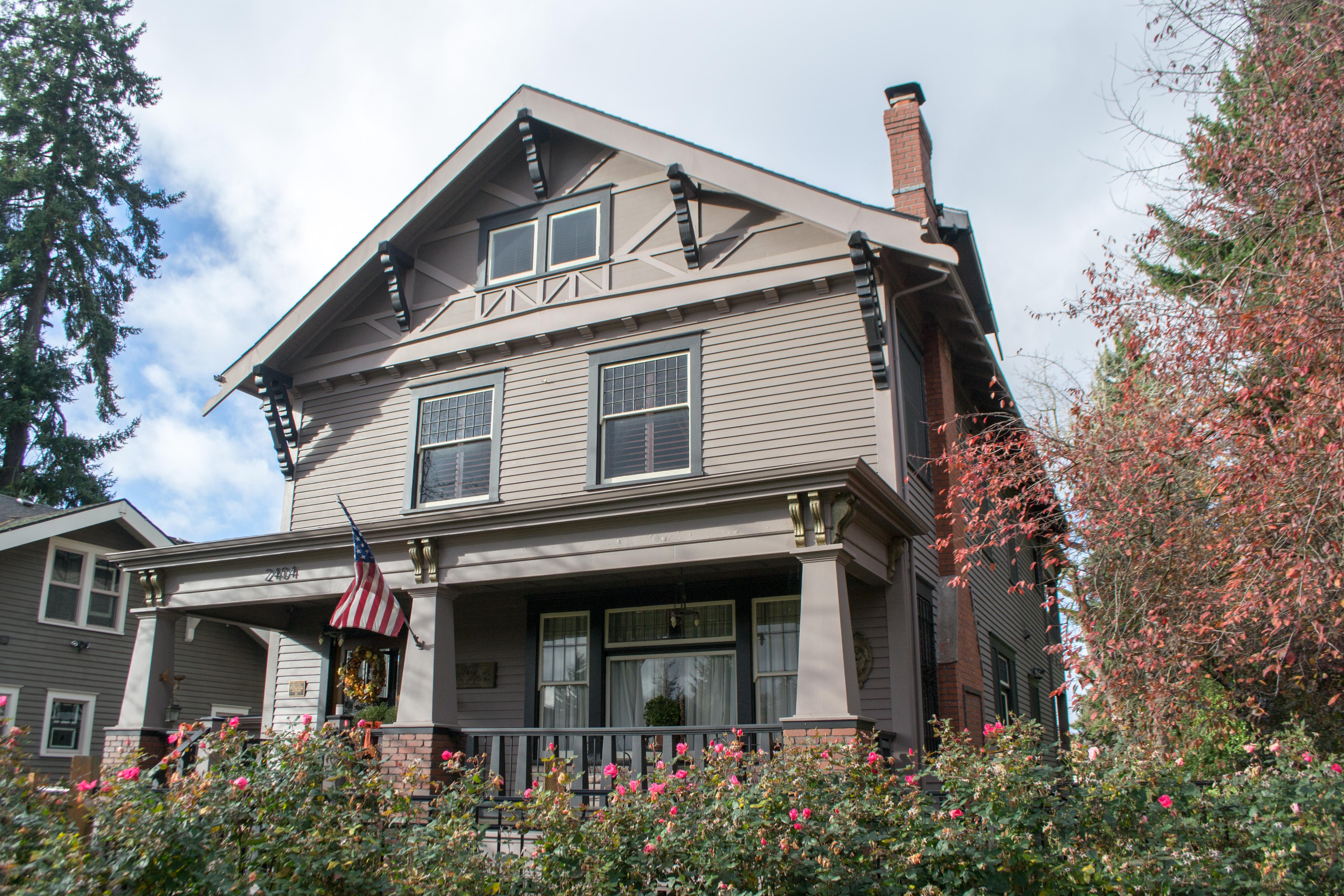
- The Kiggins house in 2013, five years after moving from East Evergreen Blvd.

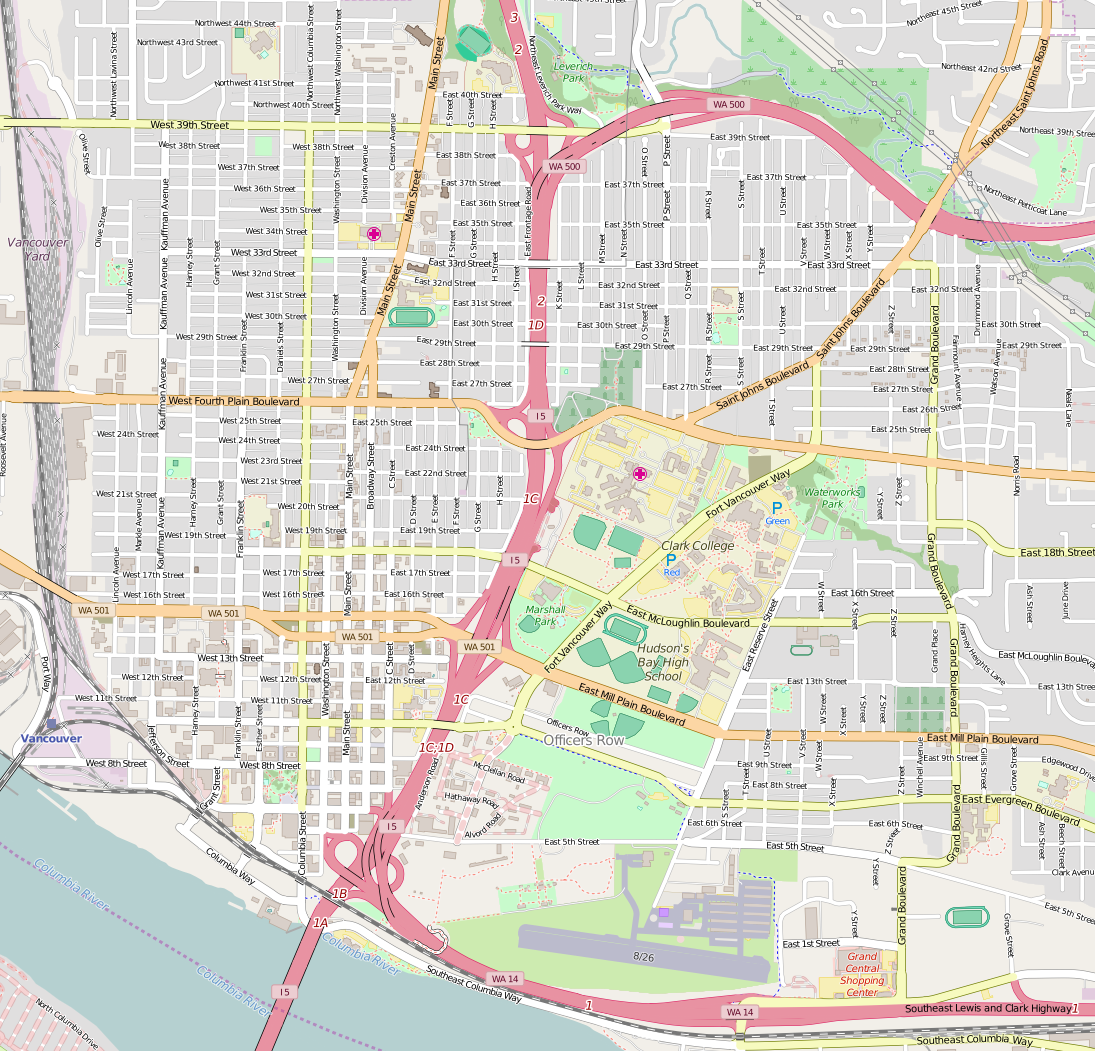
- Location within Vancouver Washington
- Location: 2404 H Street, Vancouver, Washington
- Coordinates: 45°38′19.8″N 122°39′50.6″W
- Area: less than one acre
- Built: 1907
- Architectural style: Bungalow/craftsman
- NRHP reference No.: 95000804
- Added to NRHP: June 30, 1995

The John P. and Mary Kiggins House is a 2.5-story craftsman style house located in Vancouver, Washington. The house was constructed in 1907 for John P. Kiggins, a Vancouver businessman and theater owner who served nine terms as mayor and sponsored many civic improvement projects. The architect and builder of the house are unknown, although Kiggins was trained as a building contractor and may have built the house himself.

The Kiggins family owned the house until 1994. At that time it was sold and converted to office space, although much of the original details were preserved.

The site of original construction was East Evergreen Boulevard and C Street, but a 2008 downtown redevelopment plan, including a new community library, required that the Kiggins house be moved. After considerable preparation, the house was moved to 24th and H Streets in the Arnada neighborhood.

== See also ==
- National Register of Historic Places listings in Clark County, Washington
