= Port of Vancouver USA =

Deep-water port in Washington state, U.S.

- Interactive map of Port of Vancouver USA

Location
- Country: United States
- Location: Vancouver, Washington
- Coordinates: 45.64°N 122.7°W

Details
- Opened: 1912
- No. of berths: 13
- Draft depth: 43 feet (13 m)
- Air draft: 196 feet (60 m), restricted by Astoria–Megler Bridge

Statistics
- Website www.portvanusa.com

The Port of Vancouver USA, founded in 1912, is a deep-water port located in Vancouver, Washington along the Columbia River. The port contains five terminals, along with two of the largest mobile harbor cranes in North America which are typically used to unload wind energy equipment.

== Description ==
The Port of Vancouver USA is the furthest-inland deep-water port along the Columbia River, located in Vancouver, Washington and founded in 1912. The port contains five terminals along with two of the largest mobile harbor cranes in North America. The port is a government agency governed by three locally elected commissioners.

== Marine terminals ==
The Port of Vancouver owns and operates four active marine terminals, with berths maintained at a mean depth of 43 feet. Port terminals handle liquid bulk, dry bulk, break bulk, project cargo, and roll-on-roll-off "RORO" cargo. Frequent callers include ships exporting grain, bentonite clay, and copper concentrate, and importing slab steel, Subaru automobiles, and wind energy components. Twin mobile harbor cranes allow offloading and handling of non-conventional high, wide, and heavy (HWH) cargoes.

== Waterfront redevelopment ==
The port is redeveloping a 10-acre part of its Terminal 1 property on the Columbia River, located between the proposed Waterfront Park and the Interstate Bridge, into a mixed-use waterfront neighborhood. The NBBJ-designed project is planned to begin construction in 2017 and will include 100,000 square feet (9,300 m^{2}) of office space targeted towards biotech companies, retail spaces, up to 180 hotel rooms, up to 250 housing units, and a public market.

== Vancouver Energy project ==
The Vancouver Energy project was a proposed crude oil transport hub, with crude-by-rail offloading, storage, and marine export. Proposed by a joint venture between Tesoro Refining & Marketing Company and Savage Companies, it was met with significant resistance locally, with critics citing safety risks and environmental impacts. Opposition arose from a wide array of organizations including firefighters, local elected officials and neighborhood associations, faith groups, small businesses, Native American tribes, and environmental non-profits.

During its lengthy review process by the Energy Facility Site Evaluation Council (EFSEC), contentious elections resulted in two of the Board of Commissioner's three members being replaced with candidates opposed to the terminal's construction. In December 2017, EFSEC unanimously recommended denial of a permit to build the project, and in January 2018 Washington Governor Jay Inslee denied the permit. In February 2018, the Port of Vancouver and the joint venture agreed to terminate the ground lease, effectively ending the proposed project.
