= List of mayors of Vancouver, Washington =

The following is a list of mayors of Vancouver, Washington from 1858 on. The city of Vancouver was incorporated on January 23, 1857.

#	Mayor	Term start	Term end	Notes
1	Levi Farnsworth	1858		
2	H. F. Stryker	1859		
3	S. W. Brown	1861		
4	A. G. Tripp	1865		
5	Joseph M. Fletcher	1869		
6	O. A. Freeman	1871		
7	Abel G. Tripp (Note: Tripp died in office on September 17, 1875.)	1873	17 September 1875	
8	Louis Sohns	1875		
9	Dr Randolph Smith	1881		
10	Randolph Smith	1883		
11	J. R. Smith	1885		
12	Charles Brown	1887		
13	Louis Sohns	1889		
14	J. R. Smith	1890		
15	W. Byron Daniels	1891		
16	G. W. Stapleton	1894		
17	William Hoyt Brewster	1897		
18	A. B. Eastham	1898		
19	A. L. Johnson	1900		
20	A. B. Eastham	1901		
21	L. B. Clough	1903		
22	E. G. Crawford	1904		
23	Joseph R. Harvey	1906		
24	E. M. Green	1907		
25	John Phillip Kiggins	1908		1st Term
26	C. S. Irwin	1911		
27	Henry Drass	1913		
28	Milton Evans	1914		
29	Grover R. Percival (Note: Percival disappeared October 17, 1920. His body was found November 22, 1920.)	1918	1920	
30	John Phillip Kiggins	1920		2nd Term
31	B. E. Allen	1925		
32	John Phillip Kiggins	1927		3rd Term
33	Edward A. Hamilton (Note: Hamilton was in a traffic accident in late 1935 and died in January 1936. City councilman Pender was chosen by his fellow councillors to be mayor until the next election.)	20 May 1935	31 December 1935	Was victim in a car accident, and finally passed away on New Years Eve of 1935.
34	C. Art Pender (Note: Pender disliked being mayor and resigned within a few months of assuming the office. Breckel took over, as no other city councillor wanted to be mayor.)	1936	1936	Supposedly hated the job. Resigned after 8 months.
35	Joseph Powell Breckel	1936		Chose not to run for re-election.
36	John Phillip Kiggins	1937	1938	4th Term
37	A. N. Stanley	1939		
38	John A. Hogg	1942		
39	Fred W. Sinclair	1944		
40	V. B. Anderson	1948		
41	Ralph E. Carter	1952		
42	Robert S. McCall	June 1954		
43	Roy W. Adams	1955		
44	Henry L. Schumacher	1956		
45	Irving A. Jensen	1958		
46	P. L. "Bob" Wilson	1960		
47	Rudolph Luepke	1962		
48	Robert D. McMullen	1966		
49	Albert C. Angelo	1967		
50	Irving C. Jensen	1969		
51	Lloyd Stromgren	1972		
52	James Gallagher	1974		
53	Jim Justin	1978	1984	
54	Bryce Seidl	1984	1987	
55	Bruce Hagensen	1988		
56	Royce Pollard	1996	2010	
57	Tim Leavitt	2010	2018	
58	Anne McEnerny-Ogle	2018	Incumbent Running for 3rd term.	

== See also ==
- City government in Washington (state)
