= Interstate Bridge =

Highway bridge near Portland, OR, USA

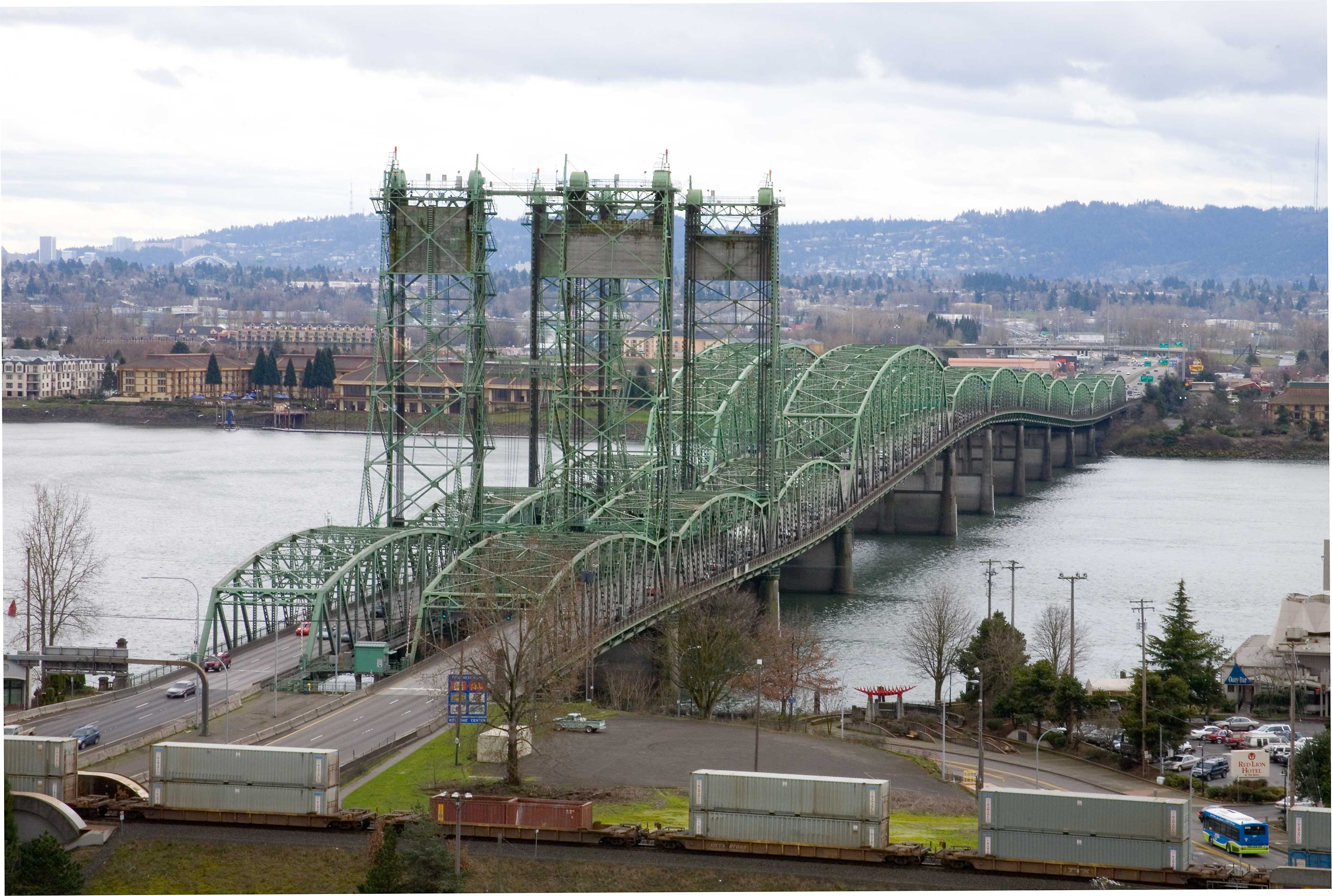
- Looking south from Vancouver
- Coordinates: 45°37′05″N 122°40′31″W
- Carries: 6 lanes of I-5
- Crosses: Columbia River
- Locale: Portland, Oregon to Vancouver, Washington
- Maintained by: Oregon Department of Transportation
- ID number: 01377, 07333

Characteristics
- Design: Dual truss with vertical lifts
- Total length: 3,538 ft (1,078 m)
- Width: Northbound span 38 ft (12 m); southbound span 39 ft (12 m)
- Height: 242 ft (74 m)
- Longest span: 531 ft (161.8 m)
- Clearance below: 72 ft (21.9 m) at highest fixed span; 176 ft (53.6 m) at open lift span

History
- Designer: Waddell & Harrington
- Opened: February 14, 1917(Northbound span), 1958 (Southbound span)
- Portland–Vancouver Highway Bridge
- U.S. National Register of Historic Places
- Location within Portland, Oregon
- Location: Portland, Oregon; Vancouver, Washington
- Coordinates: 45°37′05″N 122°40′31″W
- Built: 1915–16
- MPS: Historic Bridges/Tunnels in Washington State TR
- NRHP reference No.: 82004205
- Added to NRHP: July 16, 1982

Statistics
- Daily traffic: 133,737 (2023)

The Interstate Bridge (also Columbia River Interstate Bridge, I-5 Bridge, Portland-Vancouver Interstate Bridge, Vancouver-Portland Bridge) is a pair of nearly identical steel vertical-lift, Parker through-truss bridges that carry Interstate 5 traffic over the Columbia River between Vancouver, Washington and Portland, Oregon in the United States.

The present-day northbound bridge opened to traffic in 1917 as a single bridge carrying two-way traffic. Its name is a simple descriptive one as a bridge connecting two states, decades before the Interstate Highway System existed. A second twin bridge, which carries southbound traffic, opened in 1958. The twin bridges are each over 3,500 feet (1,067 m) long and carry three lanes of traffic. The bridges handle a combined 130,000 vehicles daily. It was added to the National Register of Historic Places in 1982, as the "Portland–Vancouver Highway Bridge".

Since 2005, several proposals for replacing the bridge have been produced and debated. The bridge is considered responsible for traffic congestion of both road and river vehicles. Plans for a replacement bridge, known as the Columbia River Crossing (CRC) project, estimated to cost at least $3.4 billion, had come together by 2012 after many delays, but were very controversial, with both strong support and strong opposition. In late June 2013, the CRC project was canceled, after the Washington state legislature declined to authorize funding for the project. The Interstate Bridge Replacement Program, a joint effort between ODOT, WSDOT, Federal Highway Administration, Federal Transit Administration, Metro, Southwest Washington Regional Transportation Council, the cities of Portland and Vancouver, the Port of Portland, and the Port of Vancouver USA, was relaunched in 2017.

== First bridge ==
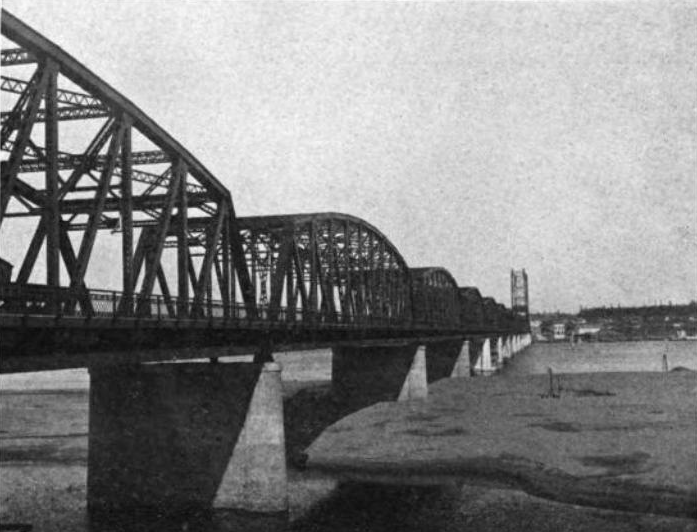
Interstate Bridge looking north from Oregon, 1917

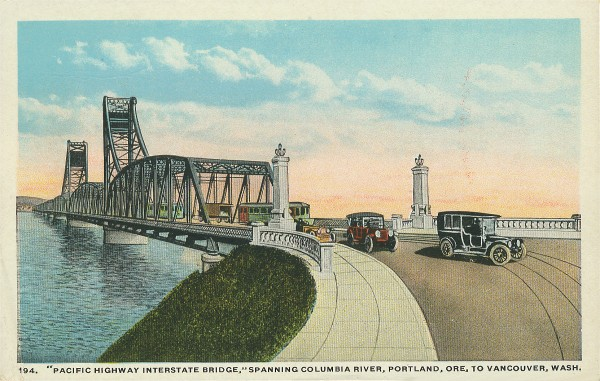
Postcard showing streetcar tracks, period autos

Before a permanent crossing existed between Portland and Vancouver, there was an overcrowded ferry system operated by Pacific Railway, Light & Power Co.

Plans for the original bridge began as early as 1912, with local efforts leading to an initial survey and bond measures totaling $2,000,000; $1.5 million contributed from Portland, and $500,000 from Vancouver. Waddell & Harrington were retained as the project's consulting engineers. Construction on the bridge began in March 1915, and the structure opened on February 14, 1917 at a final cost of $1.75 million, which was shared between Clark and Multnomah counties. Clark County paid $500,000 and Multnomah County paid $1.25 million—probably proportional to population.

The first bridge has a total of 13 steel spans, with three measuring 275 feet (84 m) in length and the remaining ten spans 265 ft (81 m) each. Piers sit atop pile caps on wooden pilings approximately 70 feet deep. One of the 275-foot (84 m) spans is the lift span for allowing river traffic under the bridge. The lift span is capable of moving 136 ft (41 m) vertically, and provides 176 ft (53.6 m) of clearance below when fully raised. The towers are 190 ft (57.9 m) tall, above the roadway.

The original paved roadway was 38 ft (11.6 m) wide and had a 5 ft (1.52 m) wide sidewalk. It was the first automobile bridge across the river between Washington and Oregon, and the second to span the river at all, after the Wenatchee Bridge of 1908. It was originally a toll bridge costing 5¢ per vehicle or per horse and rider, equivalent to $1.26 in 2025. In 1928 the states of Washington and Oregon jointly purchased the bridge from the counties and discontinued tolling the following year. The Oregon Department of Transportation became the lead agency responsible for the maintenance and operations of the structure.

Electric streetcars operated across the bridge from opening day in 1917 until 1940. The bridge's deck carried dual gauge track, to accommodate both Vancouver's standard gauge cars and Portland's 3 ft 6 in (1,067 mm) gauge cars. Before the bridge, Portland had had a Vancouver streetcar line since 1893, but it ran to Hayden Island, where passengers transferred to a ferry owned by the street railway company to continue across the river to Vancouver. Streetcar service across the Interstate Bridge ended on September 3, 1940.

The bridge became part of then-new Interstate 5 in 1957. It was previously part of U.S. Route 99 when that route was established in 1926.

== Second bridge and renovations ==
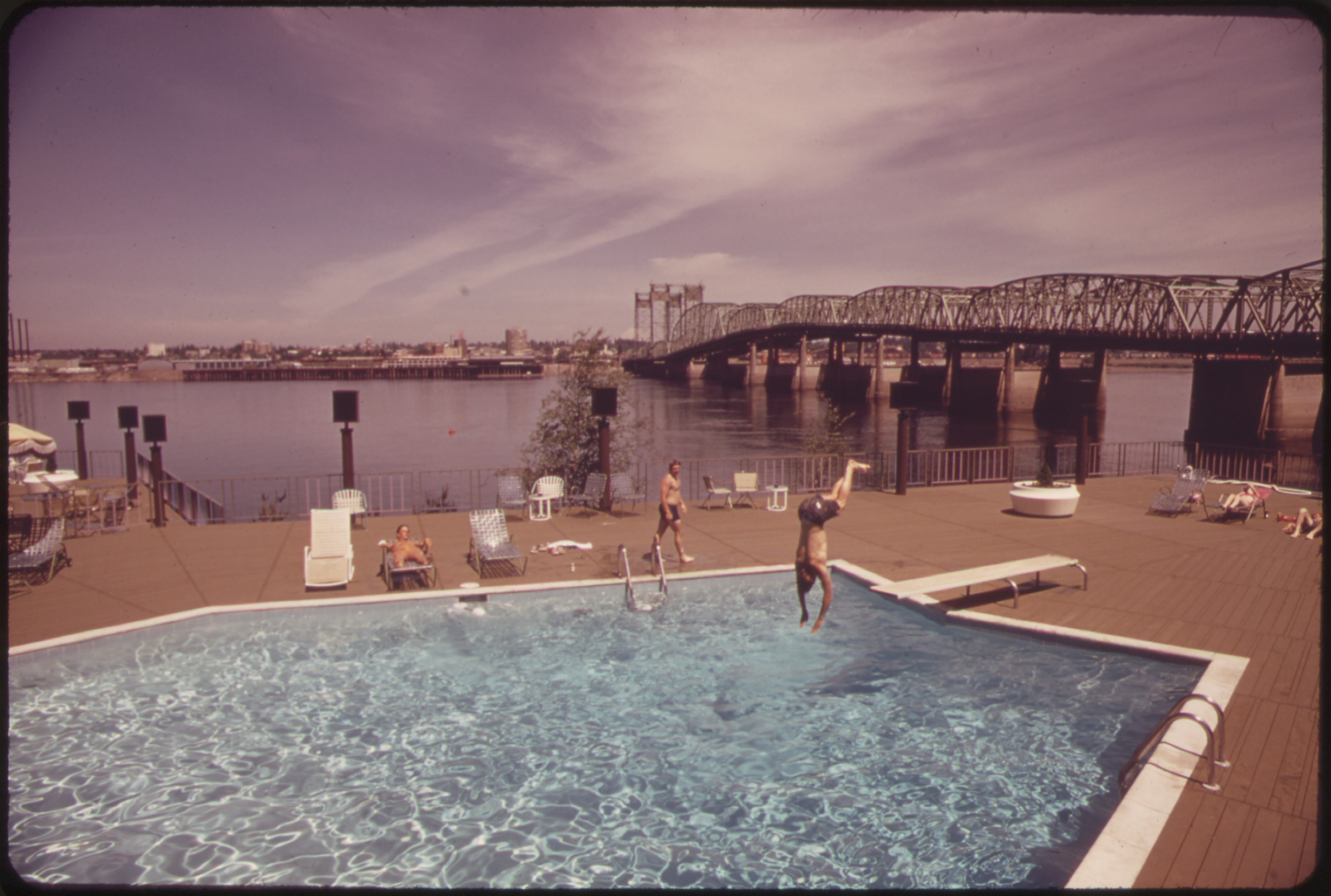
Interstate Bridge in 1973 as seen from the now demolished Thunderbird Hotel on the Oregon side

Plans to address congestion on the first Interstate Bridge, which carried over 30,000 vehicles per day by 1948, were drawn after World War II by highway officials in Oregon. The chief highway engineer, R. H. Baldock, proposed a second span over the Columbia River after it was determined that expanding the existing bridge was not feasible. Several sites were proposed and surveyed, but ultimately a twinned span west of the original bridge was chosen in September 1950 by Oregon and Washington. The proposed reinstatement of the toll led to a lawsuit that was heard by the Washington Supreme Court in September 1953 and decided in the states' favor.

In 1958, a $14.5 million ($161.8 million in 2025 dollars) project created a second, almost identical span and doubled the capacity of the bridge. The new bridge was built with a "humpback" that provides 72 ft (21.9 m) of vertical clearance and minimizes bridge openings. Construction began in summer 1956, and the new, parallel bridge opened to traffic on July 1, 1958.

At the time the new bridge was opened, the old one was temporarily closed for rebuilding to give it a matching humpback section. When both bridges were first open concurrently, on January 8, 1960, each bridge became one-way (the new bridge for southbound traffic and the old one for northbound traffic) and tolls were reinstated at $0.20 for cars, $0.40 for light trucks, and $0.60 for heavy trucks and buses. The tolls were removed in 1966 after the construction expenses were paid off.

A $3 million ($7.4 million in 2025 dollars) upgrade to the lift cables, expansion joints, and a deck repaving was completed in 1990. The diesel generator used to power the lift was replaced in 1995 at a cost of $150,000. In 1999, the bridge was repainted at a cost of $17 million. A $10.8 million electrical upgrade was completed in mid-May 2005. The damaged trunnion on the northbound bridge was replaced in September 1997, requiring a full shutdown of I-5 for six days; the project was completed ahead of the original schedule, which anticipated a 21-day closure. A temporary commuter train was operated by Amtrak from Union Station in Portland and Vancouver station during peak hours. The free trains had ten round trips and drew an average of 1,335 passengers per day; the low ridership was attributed to the isolated location of Vancouver's station. The northbound bridge's trunnion was replaced in 2020 with all traffic carried on the southbound bridge, arranged into two lanes in the peak direction controlled by a zipper machine.

== Vertical lift ==
The bridge is 3,538 feet (1,078 m) long with a main span of 531 feet (162 m). The vertical lift provides 176 feet (53.6 m) of river clearance when fully opened. Openings last about ten minutes and occur between 20 and 30 times per month, or around 300 per year.

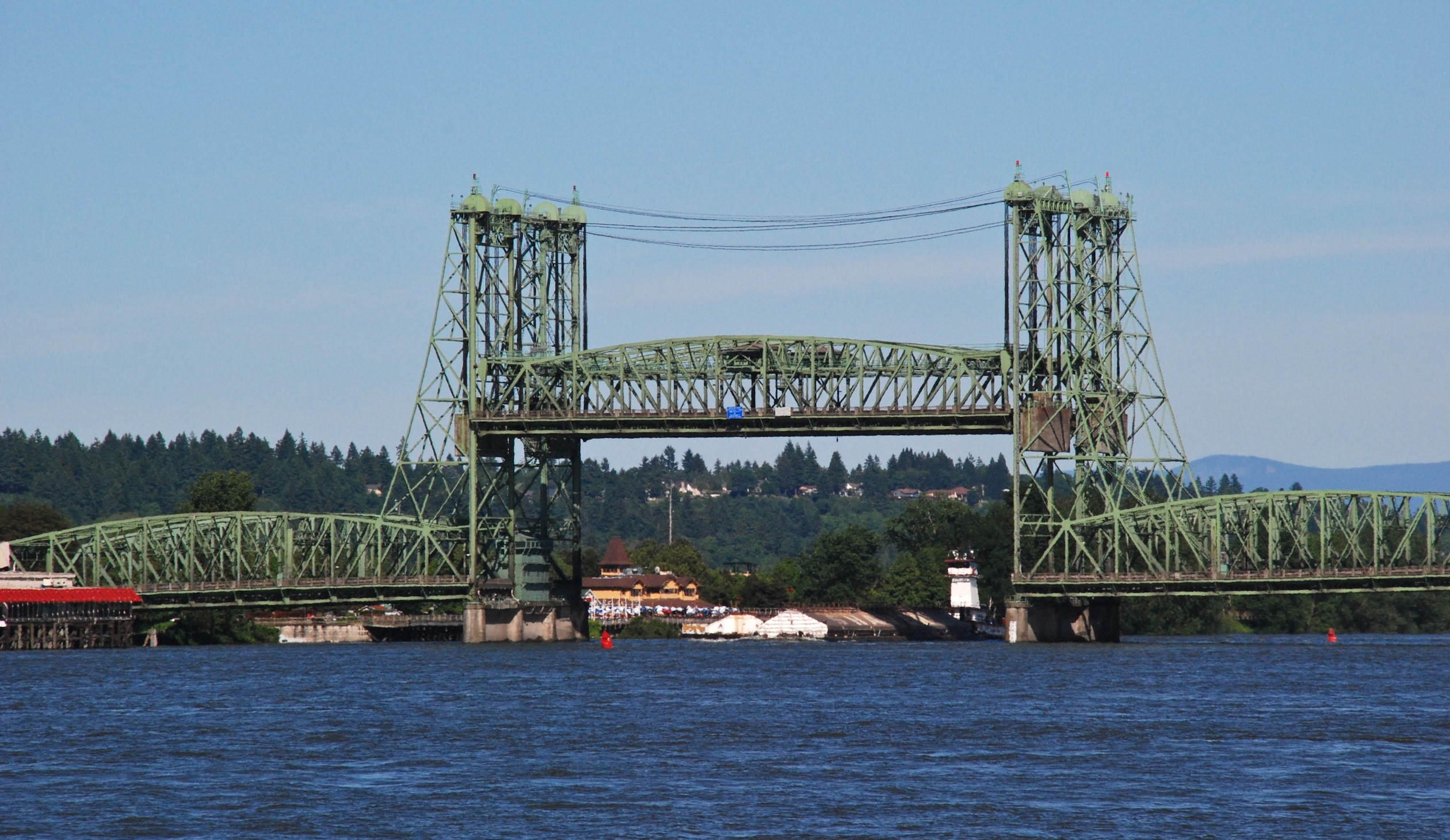
A barge passing under the raised lift spans

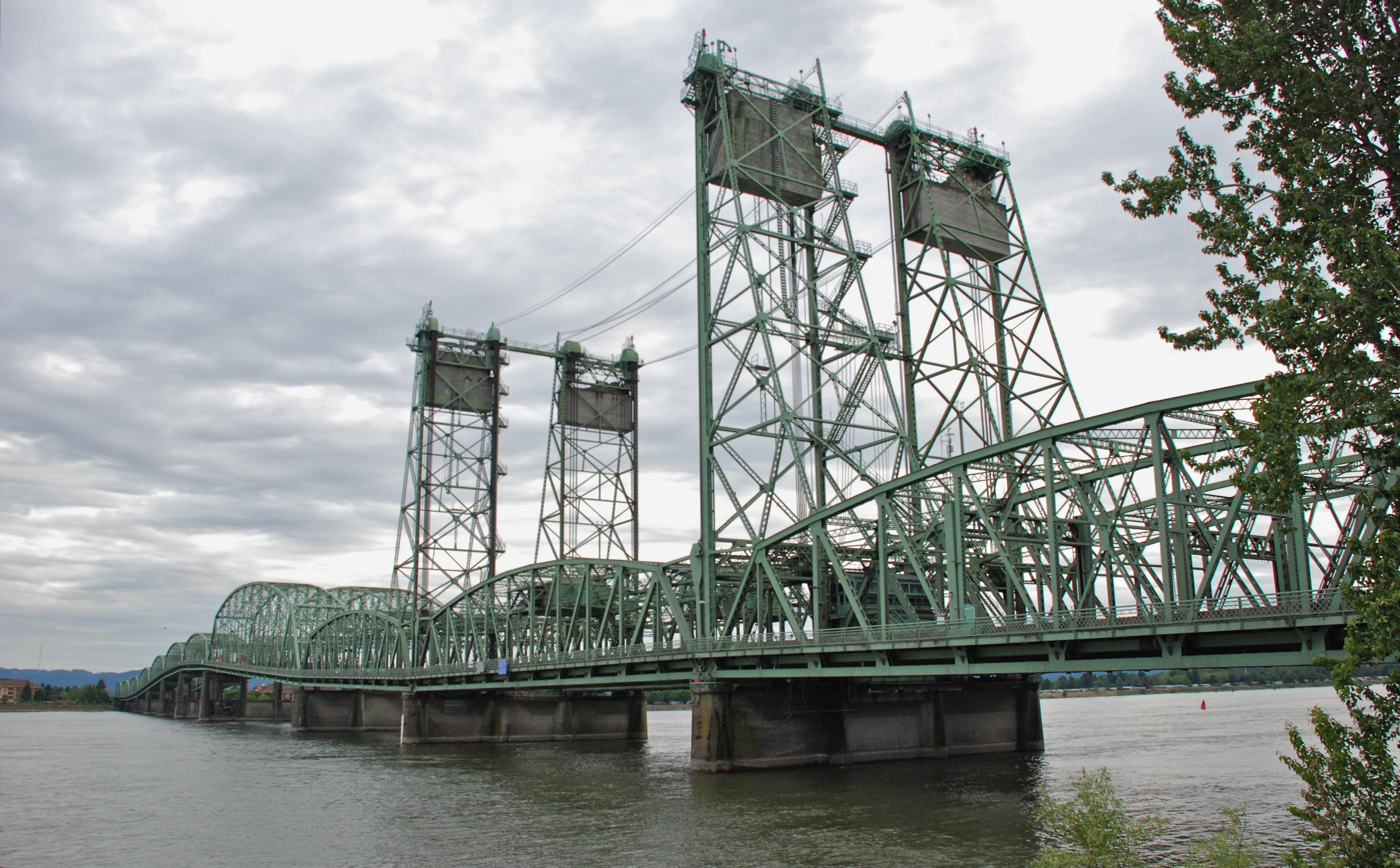
Viewed from the northeast, in Vancouver

Outside peak commuting times (6:30 a.m. to 9 a.m. and from 2:30 p.m. to 6 p.m), marine traffic is granted right of way at the bridge by federal law (33 CFR 117.869).

In 2006, the six total lanes of the bridges carried 130,000 vehicles daily. Full traffic capacity occurs four hours every day.

The Interstate Bridge's name is a simple descriptive one based on its location, as a bridge connecting two states. In 1917, the new bridge gave its name to Interstate Avenue, a Portland arterial street comprising Maryland Avenue and Patton Avenue, which were renamed shortly before the bridge opened.

== Replacement planning ==
=== Columbia River Crossing (2005–2013) ===
The bridge is frequently a bottleneck which impacts both traffic on the freeway, as well as on the river. The Oregon and Washington transportation departments are jointly studying how to replace the bridge. Both spans have been rated as "functionally obsolete," with sufficiency ratings of 18.3% and 49.4% for the original and second spans, respectively. Initially, the estimated cost for a replacement bridge was around $2 billion, but that number has climbed steadily to around $3.4 billion. An independent study in 2010 estimated the full cost to be closer to $10 billion.

Design of a replacement (especially a fixed-span bridge) is complicated by the existence of a railroad drawbridge crossing the Columbia a short distance downriver (on the Burlington Northern Railroad Bridge 9.6), which constrains the location of the shipping channel; and by approach paths to Portland International Airport in Portland and to Pearson Field in Vancouver, which limit the height of any new structure. Some have proposed replacing the bridge in a different location. There were originally 12 transportation plans that were being studied to improve and expand the Interstate 5 crossing of the Columbia River. In late 2006, four of these plans were selected for a final proposal, along with a fifth no-build option. The Columbia River Crossing project's six local partner agencies selected a replacement I-5 bridge and light rail extension to Clark College as the project's Locally Preferred Alternative (LPA) in 2008.

There is also a longstanding debate as to whether or not a new bridge would include a MAX Light Rail line, express buses, or bus rapid transit. During his 2007 "State of the City" address, Vancouver mayor Royce Pollard stated

I've said it before, but it bears repeating – Vancouver and Clark County residents have the cheapest buy-in to one of the most successful light-rail systems in the world, the MAX system. There is over $5 billion invested in light rail across the river. We can tap into that system at a very minimal cost. We’d be foolish not to. The bi-state Columbia River Crossing initiative is making plans for the future of our community for 50 years and beyond. This project should not happen without integrating light rail that comes into downtown Vancouver. If the final alternative doesn’t have a light rail component, I will not support it.

In December 2007, Oregon governor Ted Kulongoski advocated for a new bridge, publicly endorsing the Oregon Business Plan's proposal.

In 2008, as fuel prices increased and project cost estimates soared, local news sources questioned whether the project is worth the costs. The Portland Mercury wrote a piece voicing concerns that a 12-lane highway bridge to Vancouver, which was believed to have virtually no land use restrictions, would encourage suburban sprawl and development north of the river.

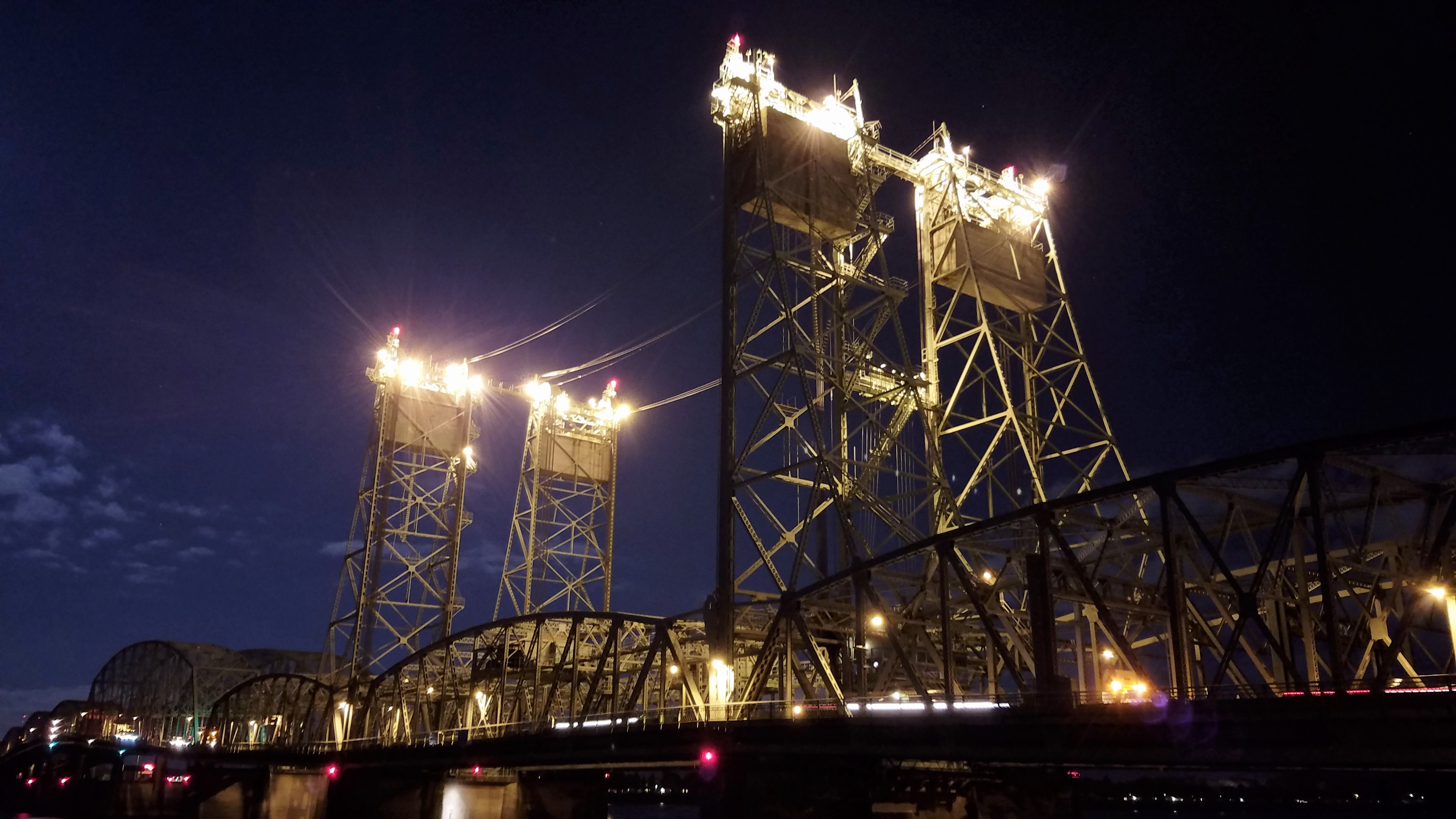
Interstate Bridge in 2016 with additional illumination for late-night work crews.

Further concerns over the 12-lane "Columbia River Crossing" (CRC) proposal include its failure to examine critical environmental impacts, such as damage to Clark County's drinking water supply, endangered fish habitat in the Columbia, and air pollution in North Portland.

In 2008, the Environmental Protection Agency found that the Draft Environmental Impact Statement for the CRC had failed to adequately cover these issues, as well as the potential induced demand for suburban sprawl. In a letter to CRC planners, the EPA wrote that "There was no indication (in the CRC environmental impact statement) of how these vulnerable populations might be impacted by air pollution, noise, diesel construction vehicles and increased traffic", referring to minority communities in North Portland.

In June 2013, the Washington Legislature voted against further funding of the CRC. On June 29, Oregon Governor John Kitzhaber directed the CRC to shut down operations.

=== Interstate Bridge Replacement Program (2019–present) ===
The relaunched Interstate Bridge Replacement Program is a joint effort between ODOT, WSDOT, Federal Highway Administration, Federal Transit Administration, Metro, Southwest Washington Regional Transportation Council, the cities of Portland and Vancouver, the Port of Portland, and the Port of Vancouver USA.

The Joint Oregon-Washington Legislative Action Committee was formed by the Washington legislature in 2017 to study a bridge replacement, but initially had no Oregon representation for a year. The new committee was formed to prevent $140 million in federal funding allocated for the CRC from being recalled after a deadline, which was extended to 2025. In April 2019, the Washington legislature approved $17.5 million to establish a project office to conduct pre-design and planning work, which was followed by a matching contribution from the Oregon Transportation Commission in August.

A new timeline for the project, with the start of environmental review in 2020 and construction by 2025, was approved by the joint committee in late 2019. The replacement bridge's design remained unspecified, with discussions about the inclusion of light rail, lane configurations, and investigating a third crossing all under consideration. Former Michigan Department of Transportation deputy director Greg Johnson was appointed as the bridge program administrator in June 2020, serving 5 years until his departure in December 2025.

Several alternative ideas were proposed, including an immersed tube tunnel, a third bridge, and a bascule bridge favored by the U.S. Coast Guard. A tunnel was deemed infeasible, due to costs and the difficulty of constructing a connection to Hayden Island and Vancouver's SR-14, while moveable bridge options were deemed undesirable due to cost and delays from boat traffic.

In December 2022, the project was estimated to cost $5.5 billion to $7.5 billion, with expected contributions of $1 billion each from Washington and Oregon and the rest covered by federal funding, including funds tied to the light rail component. The locally preferred alternative selected in 2022 was eight lanes, in contrast to the ten lanes the CRC had proposed, and included modifications to several interchanges, due to the higher height of the bridge. As presented to the Oregon legislature in April 2023, this design would be split into twin northbound and southbound bridges, allowing for the construction of one at a time. Replacement of a separate bridge connecting Hayden Island to mainland Portland would be included. The placement of light rail, cyclists and pedestrians on a lower deck or on additional lanes of a single deck remained under consideration. Additionally, the U.S. Coast Guard requested an alternative design with a drawbridge to preserve the clearance for river traffic, which would be lowered by 60 feet (18 m) if the locally preferred alternative was built.

By January 2026, public records requests revealed the draft cost estimates had increased further to $13.6 billion. Construction was scheduled to begin in late 2025 or early 2026. Tolls will be implemented on the Oregon side of the existing bridge to help fund the new bridge as it is being built. In January 2026, the Coast Guard gave its approval for the replacement bridge to be an all-fixed-span bridge, without a movable section, at a lowered height of 116 feet (35 m). In July 2026, the project received federal approval and a first phase had been funded.

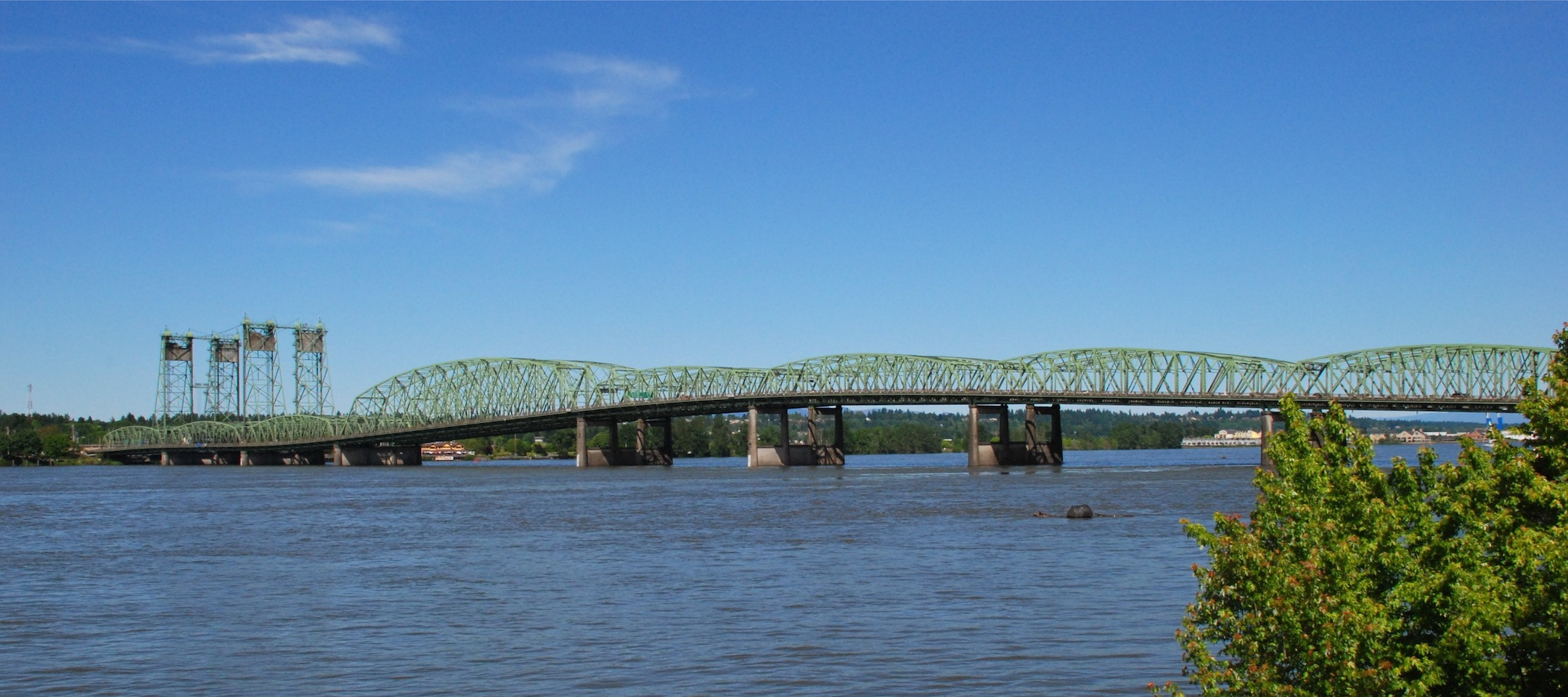
The full bridge as seen from Hayden Island, showing the 1959-built "humped" section mid-span.

== See also ==
- List of bridges documented by the Historic American Engineering Record in Washington (state)
- List of bridges on the National Register of Historic Places in Oregon
