= Anne McEnerny-Ogle =

American politician and educator

58th Mayor of Vancouver, Washington
- Incumbent
- Assumed office January 1, 2018
- Preceded by: Tim Leavitt

Personal details
- Born: 1954 (age 71–72)
- Spouse: Terry Ogle
- Education: Southern Oregon State College (BS); Lewis & Clark College (MEd)

Anne McEnerny-Ogle is an American politician and educator, serving as the 58th Mayor of Vancouver, Washington.

== Education ==
McEnerny-Ogle earned a Bachelor of Science in education from southern Oregon State College, and a Master of Education from Lewis & Clark College.

== Career ==
Prior to entering politics, McEnerny-Ogle spent 30 years as a public school teacher in Lake Oswego, Oregon. In 2014, McEnerny-Ogle was elected to the Vancouver City Council.

The first woman to be elected mayor of Vancouver, she was elected to succeed Tim Leavitt in November 2017 for a term beginning January 1, 2018. She was endorsed in the race by The Columbian, which noted her prior term on the city council since 2014. She was also on the Vancouver Planning Commission and several other local government boards. The mayoral office is officially nonpartisan.

== See also ==
- List of mayors of Vancouver, Washington
