= Hayden Island, Portland, Oregon =

Hayden Island
- Neighborhood
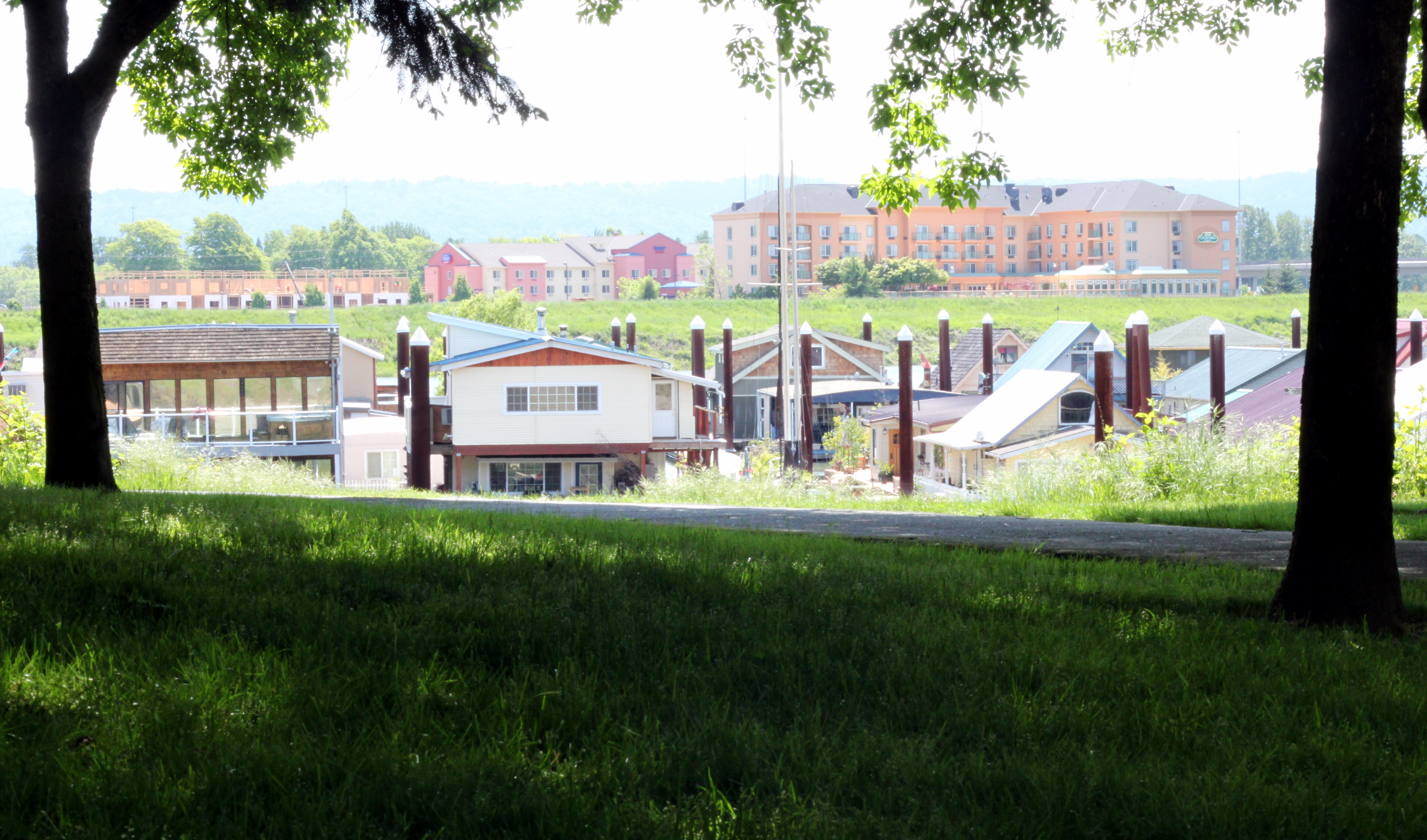
- Interactive map of Hayden Island
- Coordinates: 45°36′43″N 122°40′34″W
- Country: United States
- State: Oregon
- City: Portland

Government
  - Association: Hayden Island Neighborhood Network
  - Coalition: Northeast Coalition of Neighborhoods

Area
  - Total: 1.69 sq mi (4.38 km^{2})

Population (2000)
  - Total: 2,130
  - Density: 1,260/sq mi (486/km^{2})

Housing
  - No. of households: 1224
  - Occupancy rate: 84% occupied
  - Owner-occupied: 1012 households (83%)
  - Renting: 212 households (17%)
  - Avg. household size: 1.74 persons

Hayden Island is an island in the Columbia River between Vancouver, Washington, and Portland, Oregon. The wide main channel of the Columbia (and the Washington–Oregon state line) passes north of the island. To the south, sheltered by the island, is a smaller channel known as North Portland Harbor. Much of Hayden Island (and connected Tomahawk Island to the east) is within Portland city limits, and recognized as one of its 95 neighborhoods.

Interstate 5 provides the only roadway connection to the island, via the northernmost Oregon exit, to the rest of North Portland and, with the Interstate Bridge, to Vancouver to the north. The BNSF Railway crosses North Portland Harbor (via the Oregon Slough Railroad Bridge) and the western part of the island to the west of I-5, before crossing the Columbia via the Burlington Northern Railroad Bridge 9.6. The east end of the island, often called Jantzen Beach, has highly developed retail areas near the freeway, hotels, offices, manufactured home communities, and condominium complexes. Further east there are several houseboat moorages and marinas.

Until the Interstate Bridge opened in 1917, ferries provided service between Portland and Vancouver from landings on the island's north shore. After the opening of the bridge, streetcar service opened Hayden Island to amusement park developments due to its beaches and strategic location. Jantzen Beach, the last operating amusement park, closed in 1970. Tomahawk Island, just off the east tip of Hayden Island, became another amusement park—Lotus Isle—for a few years in the 1930s.

Because Oregon does not have a state sales tax, and Washington has one of the higher state sales taxes, it is common practice for people in Southwest Washington to travel to Oregon for larger taxable purchases. The Jantzen Beach Shopping Center and many hotels populate this part of the island. A narrow neck of land connects Hayden Island to Tomahawk Island (not an independent island since construction of the linkage), which has numerous marinas, yacht clubs, and the Yacht Harbor Club apartment community.

The west side of the island (in unincorporated Multnomah County) is as yet undeveloped, though it was added to the urban growth boundary by voters in 1983. The Port of Portland purchased the land in 1993 with the intention of building a large cargo facility. Metro, the regional government, has designated West Hayden Island as both high-value regionally significant habitat and as industrial land. Environmental activists have successfully blocked annexation for industrial development in 1999. But the Port of Portland renewed efforts to annex West Hayden Island in 2008 and Portland City Council voted on July 29, 2010, to go forward with an analysis of annexation that would allow 300 acres (1.2 km^{2}) for an undetermined port facility and preserve the remaining 500 acres (2.0 km^{2}) as a protected natural area.

== History ==
In 1792, the island was discovered by Lieutenant William Robert Broughton, commander of the Royal Navy survey brig HMS Chatham, who named it Menzies, after the botanist of his ship Archibald Menzies. (He also named Vancouver after his commander George Vancouver at the same time) In 1805, Lewis and Clark named the island Image Canoe Island after a large canoe carved with images of men and animals emerged from the opposite side of the island.

Hudson's Bay Company called it Vancouver Island, and in the early 19th century, it was called Shaw Island for Colonel W. Shaw who owned land on the island. In 1851, the island was renamed for the Oregon pioneer and early Vancouver settler Gay Hayden who owned the island after settling there in 1851 upon hearing of the Donation Land Claim Act a year after it was passed. He built a grand home and lived on the island for five years with his wife Mary Jane Hayden and twin children.

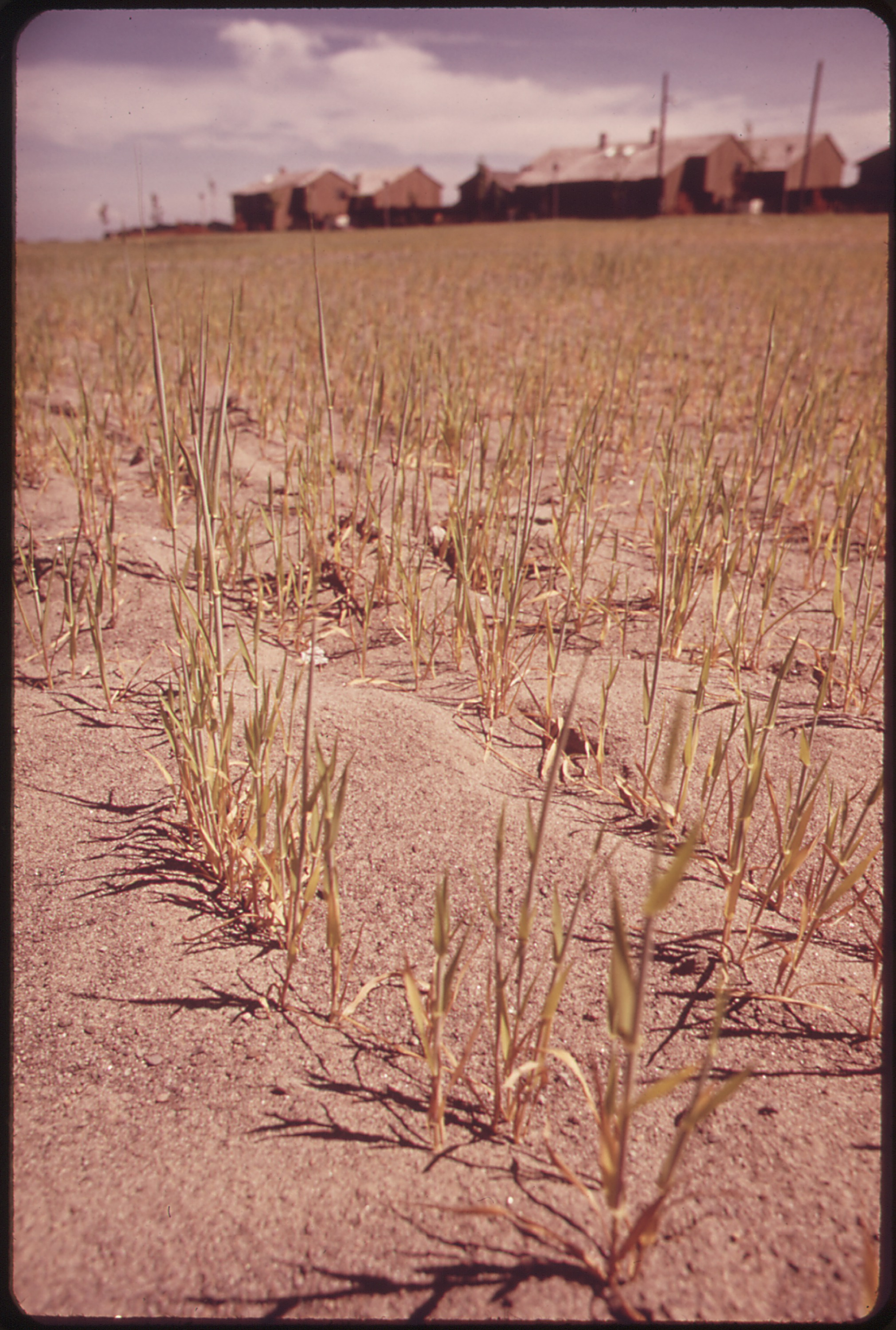
Sand dunes on Hayden Island, 1973

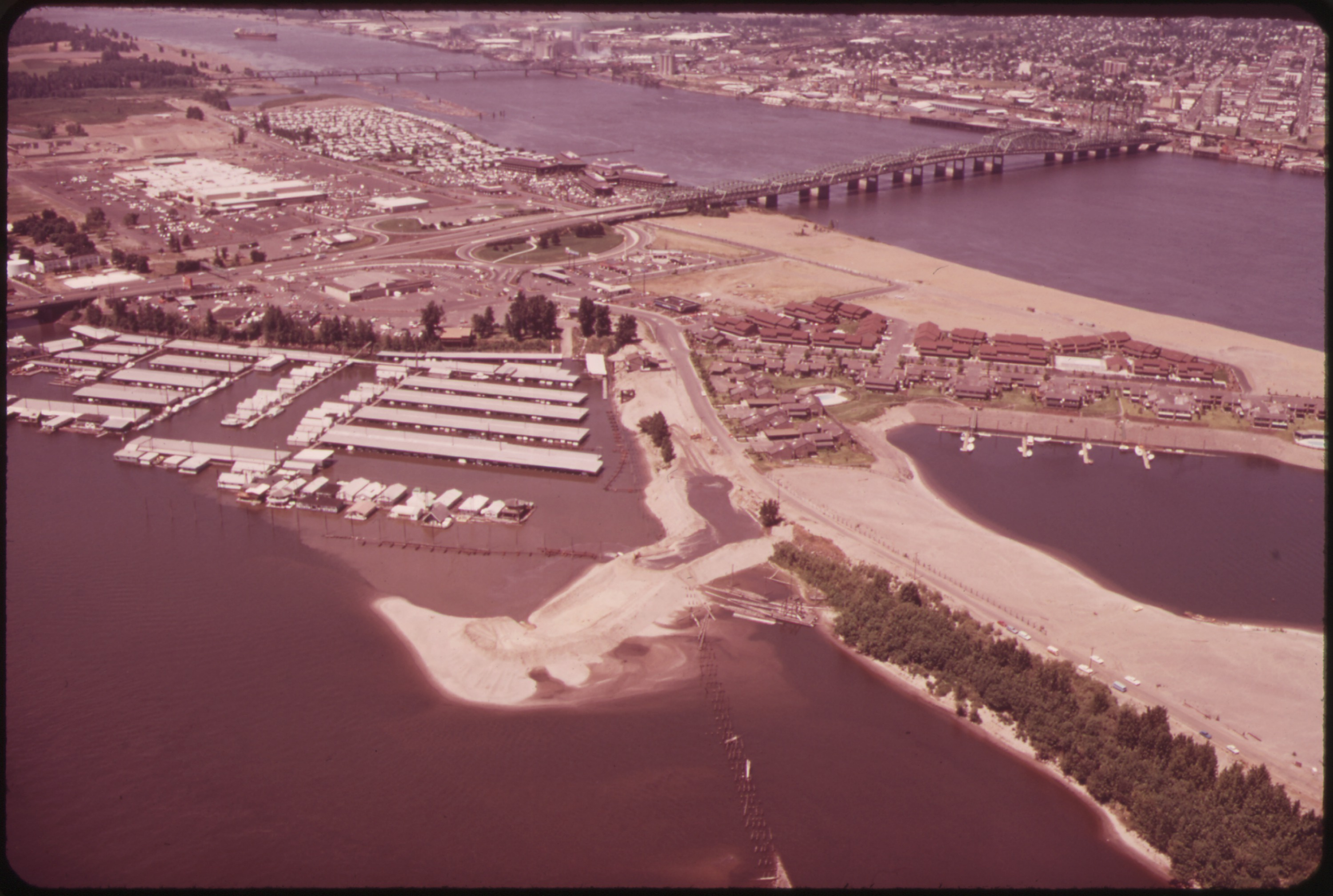
Bird's-eye view of Hayden Island and the Interstate Bridge, 1973

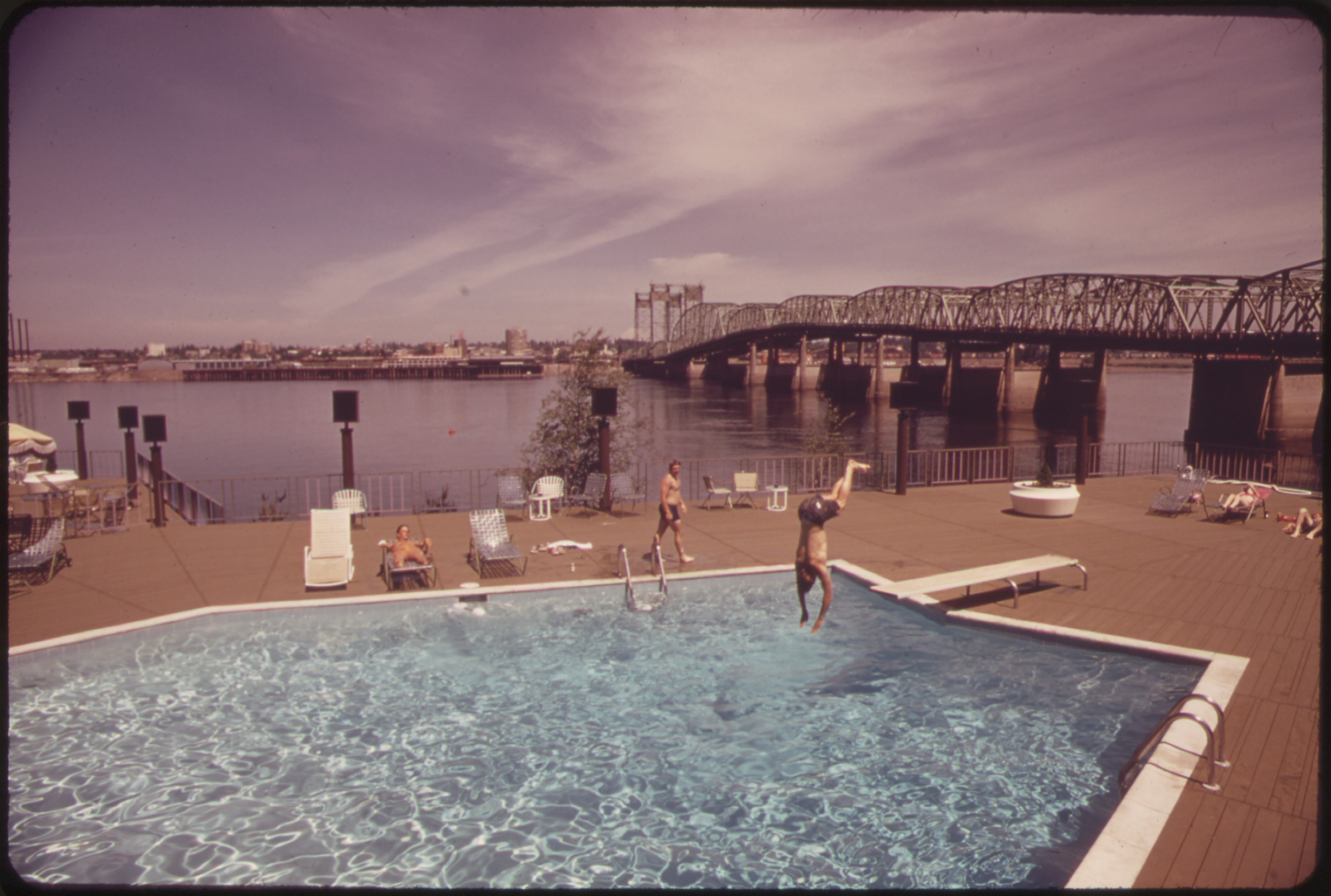
Thunderbird Motel on Hayden Island, 1973

== Development ==
In 2008, the Port of Portland began exploring and planning the annexation and development of West Hayden Island. The planning process, which is slated to end as early as the end of 2012, would conclude with an annexation agreement that would address recreation, mitigation, land management, habitat preservation, security, repair and improvements of local roads and a community enhancement fund. The proposed plan would develop 300 acres for industrial use and leave 500 acres of natural area untouched. The plan was opposed by environmental groups, such as the Audubon Society of Portland.

The city of Portland commissioned ECONorthwest to measure the net economic benefits and impacts of the proposed development. The report compared a no-development scenario to the proposed 300-acre development scenario. When accounting for natural resources, recreation, and local and port economic impacts, the report found that the benefits of development were likely to outweigh the benefits of forgoing development. The analysis also found that the benefits of development were likely to outweigh the costs of development.
