= Royce Pollard =

Mayor of Vancouver, Washington (1939–2025)

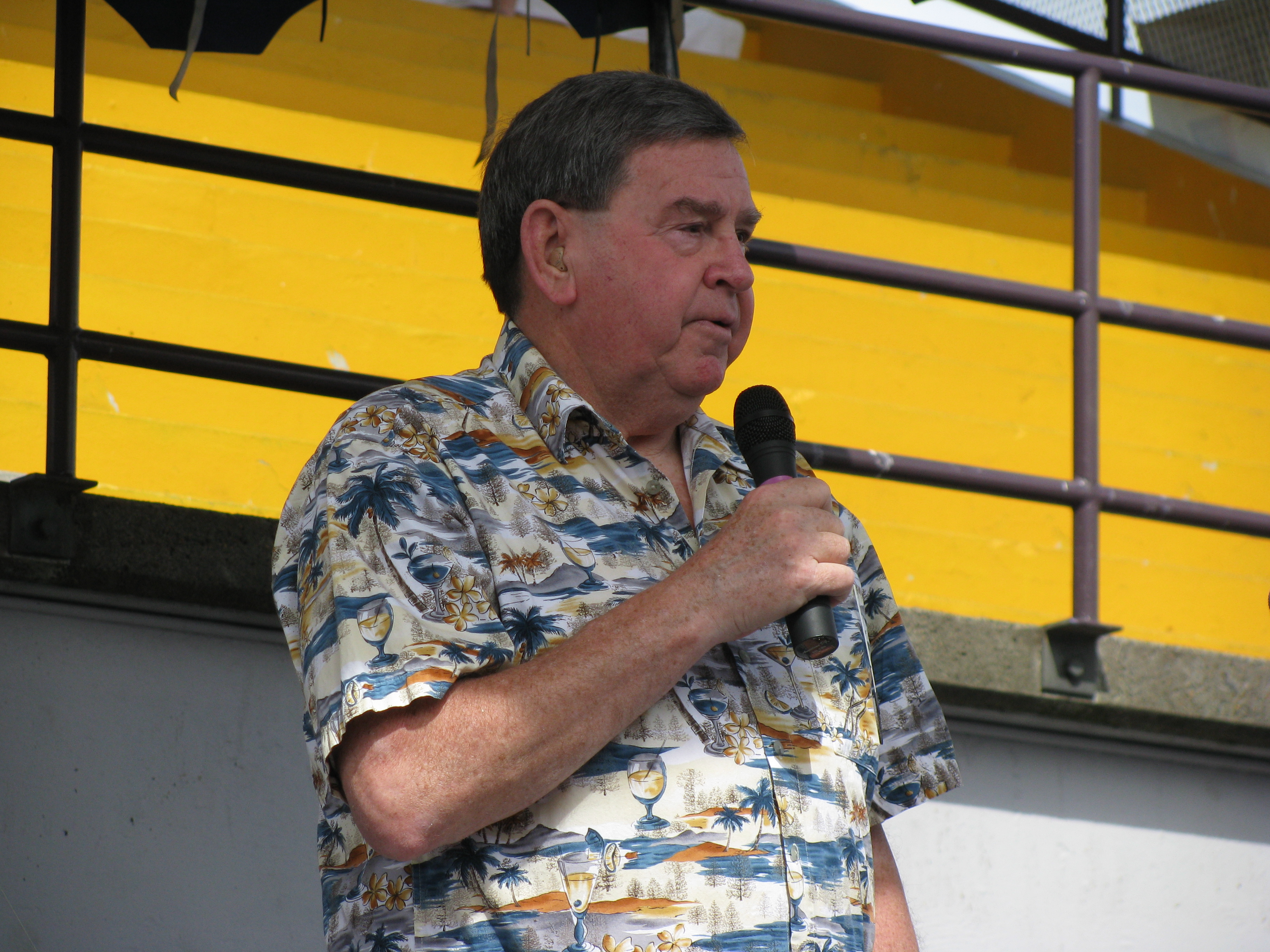
- Pollard at the 2008 Relay for Life in Vancouver

56th Mayor of Vancouver, Washington
- In office January 1, 1996 – January 1, 2010
- Preceded by: Bruce Hagensen
- Succeeded by: Tim Leavitt

Personal details
- Born: 1939 Burlington, Vermont, U.S.
- Died: February 24, 2025 (aged 85)

Royce Pollard (1939 – February 24, 2025) was an American politician who served as the six-term mayor of Vancouver, Washington. He served seven years on City Council and became mayor in 1996. He lost a reelection race to Tim Leavitt in 2010.

== Early life ==
Pollard was born in 1939. A native of Burlington, Vermont, Pollard served in the U.S. Army beginning in 1961, including deployment during the Vietnam War; he was a member of the American Legion and the Vietnam Veterans of America. His final post was as Commander of the Vancouver Barracks, from which he retired in 1988 as a lieutenant colonel. Subsequently, the Pollard family settled in Vancouver and he was elected to the City Council a year later in 1989. Pollard was married, and had two sons.

== As mayor ==
After serving for seven years on the City Council, Pollard was elected mayor in January 1996. He then served consecutive terms as mayor until 2010. Cumulatively, he held public office in the city for around 20 years, shaping much of its development in the late 20th and early 21st centuries. His most notable exploits were a major revival of Vancouver's once-dilapidated downtown core, shepherding the city's growth by 100,000 residents, and championing a controversial project to replace the Interstate Bridge and expand the MAX Light Rail system into Clark County. In addition to mass transit, Pollard long supported green modes of transportation such as walking and biking.

Pollard was a promoter of the moniker of "America's Vancouver" for the city, in order to differentiate it from the larger but younger city of Vancouver, British Columbia. The mayor was also a staunch defender of Vancouver's independence from nearby Portland, Oregon. In a highly publicized gesture in 2005, he purchased and destroyed coffee mugs with Portland logos at a Vancouver Starbucks after the company failed to remove them from stores.

== Later life and death ==
Pollard was named First Citizen of Clark County. He died on February 24, 2025, at the age of 85.

== See also ==
- List of mayors of Vancouver, Washington
