= Leverich Park =

Coordinates: 45.651°N 122.660°W

Leverich Park is a 33-acre (130,000 m^{2}) park located in Vancouver, Washington. It is located along Burnt Bridge Creek in a natural area of Vancouver adjacent to Interstate 5. The park features a large picnic shelter, picnic tables, plenty of hiking trails and a twelve-hole Disc golf course.

== History ==
The park is north of 39th St., E. of Pacific Highway, and the state of Washington's oldest Blue Star Memorial Highway marker and L-shaped area of about 33 ½ acres, lying partly within and just north of the city limits, was deeded to the city for park purposes by Mrs. Anna Leverich. It was established as a municipal park in 1931 and in the same year an obelisk was erected and a Douglas fir planted by the bicentennial celebration of George Washington’s birth. In accordance with the terms of the deed, the natural environment of the area has been preserved as much as possible. Burnt Bridge Creek, branches out among low hills with small groves of native firs, deciduous trees, and occasional cedars. The construction of Interstate 5 through Vancouver in the late 1950s split the park separating the obelisk, the Covington House historic cabin and Kiggins Bowl from the rest of the park.

== Disc Golf ==
In 2008 a twelve-hole disc golf course was added to the park. The course was the result of a cooperative effort between Vancouver-Clark Parks and Recreation, Vancouver-Clark Disc Golf and Stumptown Disc Golf.

== Sources ==
- "Vancouver-Clark Washington Parks & Recreation: Leverich Park"
- "LEVERICH PARK, Vancouver, Washington - American Guide Series on Waymarking.com"
- "Leverich Park | Vancouver/Clark Disc Golf"
