= Northwest Association for Performing Arts =

High-school band circuit in Portland, Oregon, US

- Logo (2011)
- Abbreviation: NWAPA
- Formation: 1997; 29 years ago
- Type: Performing arts organization
- Tax ID no.: 26-3945123
- Registration no.: 59299 (OR Charity I.D.)
- Legal status: 501(c)(3) organization
- Purpose: Organize and manage an annual circuit of standardized contests for competitive marching bands, winter guards and winter percussion units.
- Region served: Pacific Northwest, U.S.
- Members: 52 (2022)
- President: Colorado Paniagua (South Albany H.S.)
- Contest Coordinator: Jeff Mitchell
- Judges Coordinator: Curtis Costanza
- Revenue: ▲US$179,000 (2024)
- Expenses: ▲US$174,000 (2024)
- Website: nwapa.net
- Formerly called: Northwest Marching Band Circuit (NWMBC)

The Northwest Association for Performing Arts (NWAPA) is a governing body and competitive circuit of high school marching bands, color guards, and percussion ensembles based in Portland, Oregon. The association was founded in 1997 as the Northwest Marching Band Circuit (NWMBC). A majority of the current member high schools are based in Oregon, with others from Washington, Idaho, and California. The first circuit marching band championship was hosted in 2000.

On July 3, 2020, NWAPA announced it would not sanction any marching band events due to the coronavirus pandemic.

NWAPA is not affiliated with the similarly named North-West Pageantry Association (NWPA) based in the Puget Sound region.

== History ==
In 1997, Northwest Marching Band Circuit (NWMBC) was founded to "provide a circuit of standardized events" for high school marching bands in the region. Prior to the circuit's formation, marching band competitions in the Pacific Northwest utilized differing, and often conflicting, adjudication systems. For example, bands who attended Puget Sound Festival of Bands in Everett would earn one score which could not be directly compared to a score earned at the Cavalcade of Bands in the Tri-Cities or the Sunset Classic in Portland. The inconsistency made it difficult for band directors to accurately assess their band's progress during the competitive season. The new circuit's paramount requirement was all members agreed to utilize the same adjudication system at any competitions they hosted. In 1997, the circuit adopted a modified version of the adjudication manual published by the Western States Marching Band Conference (WSMBC), which has been continually updated.

Membership has varied between twenty and forty members in recent years. At its peak in 2006, the circuit grew to fifty-five member high schools and independent groups. The circuit was reorganized as the Northwest Association for Performing Arts (NWAPA) in August 2008.

== About ==
NWAPA operates as a public benefit nonprofit corporation registered in the State of Oregon. As of 2017, the association has not been designated as a 501(c) tax exempt organization by the IRS. It is unknown if NWAPA (or NWMBC) has ever applied for such.

=== Governance ===
Governed by a board of directors, NWAPA has nine elected officers: President, Fall Vice President, Winter Vice President–Color Guard, Winter Vice President–Percussion, Winter Vice President–Winds, Secretary, Treasurer and Past President. Each officer is elected for a two-year term.

All high school band directors, show sponsors and directors of independent or community groups who participate in NWAPA events are members of the association, and they are eligible to vote on association business and elect officers. Schools or groups who participate in two or more events in an academic year are required to pay a membership fee.

=== Archives and previous recaps ===
Founding documents, early event films and videos, competition recaps and scores, judges commentary, and other materials have been lost. Without a designated historian or archivist, or a permanent administrative office, each new class of board members and officers are responsible for maintaining any materials which come into their possession from the previous class.

A very small sample of competition scores and recaps have been preserved via the Internet Archive, or by fansites such as Marching.com and World of Pageantry. The association's website offers recaps from September 2011 to present. Contest scheduling and tabulation software is provided by Contest Dynamics, a custom package designed specifically for use by NWAPA. Previous circuit websites were marchingband.org and nwapa.us.

=== Member bands and groups ===
NWAPA events draw participants from throughout the Pacific Northwest. However, the majority of active members are from within 200 km of Portland. A few members are more distant, such as Kamiak High School from Mukilteo, Washington, Central Valley High School from Spokane Valley, Washington, and Timberline High School from Boise, Idaho. Schools such as Central Valley do not participate every year.

Bands who participate but who are not members are called "guest" bands or groups. Guest bands are not eligible for competition in championship finals. If a guest band earns a score which would ordinarily earn them a finalist position, then they are permitted to perform in exhibition.

The following high schools and independent groups are active as of August 2018. School districts with multiple schools have been grouped. Former members and previous guest bands also included.

- § Indicates current or previous show sponsor.
- Former members or previous guest bands are italicized.

==== California bands ====
- Brea Olinda High School
- Carson High School
- Del Norte High School

==== Idaho bands ====
- Kuna High School
- Nampa School District
  - Columbia High School
  - Nampa High School
  - Skyview High School
- West Ada School District
  - Centennial High School
  - Mountain View High School
  - Rocky Mountain High School
- Timberline High School

==== Oregon bands ====
- Astoria High School
- Beaverton School District
  - Aloha High School
  - Beaverton High School
  - Mountainside High School
  - Southridge High School ^{§}
  - Sunset High School
  - Westview High School
- Canby High School
- Crater High School
- Centennial High School
- Eagle Point High School
- Eugene School District
  - Churchill High School
  - North Eugene High School
  - South Eugene High School
  - Sheldon High School
- Forest Grove High School
- Grants Pass High School ^{§}
- Henley High School
- Hillsboro School District
  - Century High School ^{§}
  - Glencoe High School
  - Hillsboro High School
  - Liberty High School
- Hermiston High School
- Lincoln High School
- Madras High School
- McMinnville High School
- Newport High School
- Oregon City High School
- Phoenix High School
- Medford School District
  - North Medford High School
  - South Medford High School
- Roseburg High School
- Salem-Keizer School District
  - McKay High School
  - McNary High School
  - North Salem High School
  - Sprague High School ^{§}
  - West Salem High School ^{§}
- Sherwood High School
- Silverton High School
- South Albany High School
- Springfield School District
  - Thurston High School
  - Springfield High School,
- St. Helens High School
- Tigard High School
- Willamette High School

==== Washington bands ====
- Adna High School
- Auburn High School
- Cedarcrest High School
- Cascade High School ^{§}
- Central Valley High School
- Cheney High School
- Chimacum High School
- Clarkston High School
- Enumclaw High School
- Evergreen Public Schools
  - Evergreen High School ^{§}
  - Heritage High School
  - Mountain View High School
- Ferndale High School
- Hockinson High School
- Kamiak High School ^{§}
- Kelso High School
- Mead School District
  - Mead High School, Spokane ^{§}
  - Mt. Spokane High School, Mead
- North Mason High School
- North Thurston Public Schools
  - North Thurston High School, Lacey
  - Timberline High School
- Newport High School
- Pasco High School
- Peninsula High School
- Payette High School
- Richland School District
  - Hanford High School, Richland
  - Richland High School
- Shelton High School
- Stanwood High School
- Sultan High School
- Tahoma High School
- Tumwater School District
  - Black Hills High School
  - Tumwater High School
- Vancouver Public Schools
  - Columbia River High School
  - Fort Vancouver High School
  - Hudson's Bay High School ^{§}
  - Skyview High School
- West Valley High School
- Yakima School District
  - Eisenhower High School
  - A.C. Davis High School

==== Independent groups ====
- Affinity Indoor (percussion)
- Cascadia (winter guard)
- Evergreen (winter guard)
- Impact (percussion)
- New Era (winter guard)
- Northern Lights (winter guard)
- Oregon Crusaders Drum and Bugle Corps ^{§}
- Oregon Marching Band ^{§}
- Oregon State University Marching Band ^{§}
- Pacificaires (winter guard)
- Pinnacle (percussion)
- Summit (winter guard)
- Subito (percussion)
- Rhapsody (winter guard)

== Fall season ==
The primary competitive season for most NWAPA members is the fall marching band season. More than 5,000 students and 20,000 spectators will attend NWAPA events from September to November each year. The most popular events are those whose history predate the founding of the circuit, including: Pacific Coast Invitational sponsored by Sprague High School, Sunset Classic sponsored by Sunset High School, and the University of Oregon Festival of Bands.

The competitive season ends with the NWAPA Championships hosted the last Saturday of October or first Saturday of November by one of the circuit members, or by either University of Oregon or Oregon State University. The first circuit marching band championship was hosted in 2000.

=== Event model ===
Events or "shows" are scheduled via a bidding process which begins several months before the competitive season. Considerations for awarding an event include available volunteer personnel and experience, past show sponsor history, and available facilities.

As of 2017, show sponsors must pay NWAPA an administrative fee, and all participating band attendance fees are also retained. As a result of this change, adjudicator travel, lodging, and other administrative functions are coordinated by NWAPA and not the show sponsor. This alleviated a number of on-going issues for sponsors, such as travel and lodging arrangements for visiting adjudicators. Show sponsors retain proceeds from ticket and concessions sales, revenue generated from advertising, and any other proceeds.

NWAPA's other responsibilities at events include: managing the flow of bands through the competitive space, assisting the show sponsor with any administrative needs on-site, and providing adjudication and tabulation.

=== Classification ===
Marching band classifications are based on the number of marching members within each ensemble, including percussion and auxiliary/color guard. At present, there are four classes based on number of performing members in each band.

An Exhibition or festival class is available to visiting bands who wish to take advantage of performance opportunities. Exhibition bands receive comments from adjudicators. Many bands who sponsor events make use of Exhibition class, but they are not required to.

Class	Criteria
A	Up to 49 members
AA	51 to 59 members
AAA	60 to 89 members
AAAA	90 or more members
Exhibition	Bands of any size, comments only.

=== Adjudication ===
Regardless of the competing classes, adjudication at NWAPA events is single-tier. The handbook does not make any adjustments or recommendations in scoring large or small bands. Each show requires eight adjudicators, and a tabulator.

In 2011, NWAPA's adjudication handbook was modified or adapted from the Bands of America Adjudication Handbook. The modified system required fewer adjudicators. However, NWAPA's handbook was changed the following year to increase the number of adjudicators to the previous number.

==== Captions and rubric ====
Scoring is based on three broad categories: Effect, Music and Visual. The categories are further divided into six reference criteria, or captions, with each given a maximum value of 200 points, or up to 20 points when factored. One adjudicator is assigned to each caption, including one adjudicator for Percussion and Auxiliary. An additional adjudicator is responsible for Timing & Penalties.

The captions and their maximum values are:
Category	Caption		Caption		Points
Music	Individual Music (20) / 2	+	Music Effect (20)	=	50.00
Music	Ensemble Music (20) / 2	+	Music Effect (20)	=	50.00
Music	Percussion (20) / 2	+	Music Effect (20)	=	50.00
Visual	Individual Visual (20) / 2	+	Visual Effect (20)	=	50.00
Visual	Ensemble Visual (20) / 2	+	Visual Effect (20)	=	50.00
Visual	Color Guard (20) / 2	+	Visual Effect (20)	=	50.00
			Subtotal		100.00
			Timing & Penalties		0.00
			Total		100.00

The final score is tabulated by adding all captions, once factored, less any penalties.

NWAPA does not have captions for drum majors, twirling teams and majorettes, or dance teams. Performance excellence by a drum major is recognized by the Music or Visual adjudicators where appropriate. Twirlers and dance teams would fall under the responsibility of the Auxiliary adjudicator. Almost all participating bands will perform with a color guard team.

==== Placements and awards ====
Beginning in Fall 2017, scores are no longer announced at shows. Podium placings (1st, 2nd and 3rd) are announced for each class following prelims, as well as awards for High Brass, High Visual, High General Effect, High Auxiliary, and High Percussion. For finals, only top five placing bands are announced, along with caption awards. At NWAPA Championships, an overall champion is also announced.

Caption recaps and scores are made public following the show.

=== Event flow ===
Most events consist of two rounds: preliminary and final. In the preliminary round, bands compete based on class. The highest placing bands advance to the final round.

==== Preliminary round ====
As of 2019, the performance order of performance for each class was set as A, AA, and AAA for all future events. Units within each class perform in order drawn at the beginning of the season.

Each show sponsor sets a maximum number of bands who will advance to the final round; typically between twelve and fifteen bands. The highest scoring band in each class automatically advances to the second round, as well as the next-highest scoring bands, regardless of class, up to the maximum number allowed.

==== Final round ====
Finalists are ordered into groups of four, five or six based on their preliminary score called neighborhoods. The performance time for each band is the result of a random draw within each neighborhood. The size of each neighborhood is based on the number of competing bands who are advancing to the final round.

All finalist bands compete in Open class.

=== Past championship venues ===
The following is a list of NWAPA and NWMBC marching band championship sites:

Year	Venues	
2000	Autzen Stadium; University of Oregon; Eugene, Oregon	
2001–2003	Reser Stadium; Oregon State University; Corvallis, Oregon	
2004	Autzen Stadium; University of Oregon; Eugene, Oregon	
2005	Reser Stadium; Oregon State University; Corvallis, Oregon	
2006	Hillsboro Stadium; Hillsboro, Oregon	
2007	Reser Stadium; Oregon State University; Corvallis, Oregon	
2008	Autzen Stadium; University of Oregon; Eugene, Oregon	
2009	Reser Stadium; Oregon State University; Corvallis, Oregon	
2010	Autzen Stadium; University of Oregon; Eugene, Oregon	
2011–2016	Hillsboro Stadium; Hillsboro, Oregon	
2017–2019	Autzen Stadium; University of Oregon; Eugene, Oregon	
2020	Championships cancelled (Note: The 2020 NWAPA Marching Band Championships were cancelled.)	
Year	A/AA	AAA/AAAA
2021	Tigard High School; Tigard, Oregon	Sherwood High School; Sherwood, Oregon
2022–23	Autzen Stadium; University of Oregon; Eugene, Oregon	
2024	Hillsboro Stadium; Hillsboro, Oregon	Autzen Stadium; University of Oregon; Eugene, Oregon
2025	Hillsboro Stadium; Hillsboro, Oregon (Note: The NWAPA A/AA Championships and AAA/AAAA Championships will be hosted at Hillsboro Stadium over two separate weekends.)	

== Winter season ==
NWMBC developed offerings to color guards to continue competition into the winter season within a few years of its inception. As the activity expanded to include percussion and winds ensembles, the circuit followed suit.

=== Classification and adjudication ===
Winter color guard and percussion ensemble classes are based on criteria published by Winter Guard International (WGI). WGI uses a multi-tier adjudication handbook which separates competing units into two conferences, Scholastic for middle schools and high schools, and Independent for community and collegiate groups. Competitive classes are then based on experience and achievement, and not school or team size. WGI competitive classes are Regional, A, Open and World. NWAPA has made a special class, Cadet, available to young and developing teams

A majority of NWAPA's winter members compete as Scholastic Regional and Scholastic A units. Oregon Crusaders and Seattle Cascades Drum and Bugle Corps have entered units into competition in both color guard and percussion classes. Former WGI Independent World Class finalists Northern Lights and Rhapsody Winter Guard were NWAPA members.

The WGI Winds Adjudication System was adopted by NWAPA in 2015. Winds competition began in 2016.

== Past champions ==
=== Marching band champions ===
The following is a list of class and overall champions. The first circuit-sponsored championship was hosted in 2000, previously the University of Oregon Festival of Bands served as the de facto marching band championship event in Oregon. For championships events where all finalist bands compete in Open Class, class champions are named during the preliminary round. For championships events split between different sites or weekends, such as 2021, finalist bands compete within their class and class champions are named in the Finals round.

Year	A Class (Prelims)	AA Class (Prelims)	AAA Class (Prelims)	Open Class (Prelims)	Open Class (Note: Winning bands at NWMBC / NWAPA Championships finals competition who compete in Open Class.) (Finals)	Ref(s)
2000 (1st)	Tigard ^{(1)}	Southridge		Centennial	Centennial	
2001 (2nd)	Tigard ^{(2)}	Beaverton	North Salem	Evergreen ^{(1)}	Evergreen ^{(1)}	
2002 (3rd)	Tigard ^{(3)}	McNary		Grants Pass ^{(1)}	Evergreen ^{(2)}	
2003 (4th)	Rained out				North Salem	
2004 (5th)	Carson	Sprague		Evergreen ^{(2)}	Evergreen ^{(3)}	
2005 (6th)	Hockinson ^{(1)}	Mt. Spokane		Evergreen ^{(3)}	Evergreen ^{(4)}	
2006 (7th)	Hockinson ^{(2)}	Sunset ^{(1)}		Southridge ^{(1)}	Evergreen ^{(5)}	
2007 (8th)	Hockinson ^{(3)}	Sunset ^{(2)}		Southridge ^{(2)}	Southridge ^{(1)}	
2008 (9th)	Sunset	West Salem ^{(1)}		Southridge ^{(3)}	Southridge ^{(2)}	
Year	A Class (Prelims)	AA Class (Prelims)	AAA Class (Prelims)	Open Class (Prelims)	Open Class (Finals)	Ref(s)
2009 (10th)	Sprague	West Salem ^{(2)}	Century	Southridge ^{(4)}	Southridge ^{(3)}	
2010 (11th)	Tigard ^{(4)}	Sunset ^{(3)}	Central Valley	Grants Pass ^{(2)}	Grants Pass ^{(1)}	
2011 (12th)	Beaverton	Sunset ^{(4)}	Cascade	Central Valley	Central Valley	
Year	A Class (Prelims)	AA Class (Prelims)	—	Open Class (Prelims)	Open Class (Finals)	Ref(s)
2012 (13th)	Tigard ^{(5)}	Skyview (WA) ^{(1)}		West Salem ^{(1)}	West Salem ^{(1)}	
2013 (14th)	Tigard ^{(6)}	Skyview (WA) ^{(2)}		Grants Pass ^{(3)}	West Salem ^{(2)}	
2014 (15th)	Tigard ^{(7)}	Sherwood		West Salem ^{(2)}	West Salem ^{(3)}	
2015 (16th)	Tigard ^{(8)}	Sunset ^{(5)}		West Salem ^{(3)}	West Salem ^{(4)}	
2016 (17th)	Tigard ^{(9)}	Westview		West Salem ^{(4)}	West Salem ^{(5)}	
2017 (18th)	Tigard ^{(10)}	Sunset ^{(6)}		West Salem ^{(5)}	West Salem ^{(6)}	
2018 (19th)	Mountainside	Sunset ^{(7)}		Grants Pass ^{(4)}	Grants Pass ^{(2)}	
Year	A Class (Prelims)	AA Class (Prelims)	—	AAA Class (Prelims)	Open Class (Finals)	Ref(s)
2019 (20th)	Tigard ^{(11)}	Sunset ^{(8)}		Grants Pass ^{(5)}	Grants Pass ^{(3)}	
2020 (21st)	Championships cancelled					
Year	A Class (Finals)	AA Class (Finals)	AAA Class (Finals)	AAAA Class (Finals)	—	Ref(s)
2021 (22nd)	Glencoe	Sunset ^{(9)}	West Salem ^{(1)}	Grants Pass ^{(6)}		
Year	A Class (Prelims)	AA Class (Prelims)	AAA Class (Prelims)	AAAA Class (Prelims)	Open Class (Finals)	Ref(s)
2022 (23rd)	Aloha ^{(1)}	Sunset ^{(10)}	West Salem ^{(2)}	Grants Pass ^{(7)}	Grants Pass ^{(4)}	
2023 (24th)	Aloha ^{(2)}	Sunset ^{(11)}	West Salem ^{(3)}	Grants Pass ^{(8)}	Grants Pass ^{(5)}	
Year	A Class (Finals)	AA Class (Finals)	AAA Class (Finals)	AAAA Class (Finals)	—	Ref(s)
2024 (25th)	Southridge	Sunset ^{(12)}	West Salem ^{(4)}	Grants Pass ^{(9)}		
2025 (26th)	Kamiakin	Sunset ^{(13)}	Kamiak ^{(1)}	Grants Pass ^{(10)}		
2026 (27th)	Crater	Glencoe	Kamiak ^{(2)}	Grants Pass ^{(11)}		

=== Winter guard champions ===
Following is an incomplete list of class champions:

Year	Cadet	Scholastic Regional A (SRA)	Scholastic AA (SAA)	Scholastic A (SA)	Scholastic Open (SO)	Independent Regional A (IRA)	Independent A (IA)	Independent Open (IO)
2001–2005	No results data							
2006	Grants Pass MS	Sunset	No champion	Southridge	Evergreen	No champion	No champion	New Era
2007–2011	No results data							
2012	Southridge Youth	Liberty	Sprague	Glencoe	Skyview (Washington)	No champion	Summit	No champion
2013	West Salem Youth	Century A	Sprague	Glencoe	Skyview (Washington)	No champion	Summit	No champion
2014	West Salem MS	Century A	Liberty	West Salem	Skyview (Washington)	No champion	Summit	OCI
2015	Southridge Youth	Grants Pass	Liberty	Evergreen	Southridge	No champion	No champion	OCI
2016	West Salem Cadet	Glencoe JV	Sherwood	Skyview	Southridge	No champion	No champion	OCI
2017	West Salem Cadet	Evergreen JV	Tigard	Evergreen	No champion	No champion	Compass Rose	No champion
2018	Southridge Youth	Sherwood	Westview	Skyview	No champion	No champion	Oregon	Cascadia
2019	West Salem Cadet	Sherwood	West Salem	Skyview	No champion	No champion	Oregon	Cascadia
2020–21	Championships cancelled (Note: The 2020 and 2021 NWAPA Winter Guard, Percussion, and Winds Championships were cancelled.)							
2022	West Salem Cadet	Westview	Sherwood	Glencoe	No champion	No champion	No champion	No champion
2023	West Salem Cadet	Sheldon	Century	Glencoe	No champion	No champion	Cascadia	No champion
2024	Sherwood MS	Glencoe JV	Grants Pass	Glencoe	No champion	No champion	Cascadia	Pacificaires
2025	West Salem Cadet	Skyview	Sheldon	Century	No champion	Glencoe JV	Cascadia	Evergreen Independent (Note: Evergreen Independent (IO) is an independent winter guard with no relation to SO & SA Champion Evergreen High School or SRA Champion Evergreen High School JV.)
2026	Sherwood Cadet	Forest Grove	Sheldon	Century	No champion	Pacificaires	Glencoe	Cascadia

=== Scholastic percussion and winds champions ===
Following is an incomplete list of scholastic class champions:

Year	Cadet	—	Marching A (PSA)	Marching Open (PSO)	Marching World (PSW)	Concert A (PSCA)	Concert Open (PSCO)	—
2001–2005	No results data							
2006	No champion		Century	Westview	No champion	Evergreen MS	No champion	
2007–2011	No results data							
2012	Alki MS		Sunset	Grants Pass	No champion	Lincoln	No champion	
2013	Alki MS		Century	Kamiak	No champion	Banks	No champion	
2014	West Salem MS		Beaverton	West Salem	No champion	Grants Pass	Lincoln	
2015	Sherwood MS		Liberty	Kamiak	No champion	No champion	Kamiak	
Year	Cadet	—	Marching A (PSA)	Marching Open (PSO)	Marching World (PSW)	Concert A (PSCA)	Concert Open (PSCO)	Winds A (WSA)
2016	Sherwood MS		Sherwood	Kamiak	No champion	No champion	Kamiak	Sherwood
2017	Tigard Cadet		Skyview Liberty (AA)	Sherwood	Kamiak	Hillsboro	No champion	Sherwood
2018	Tigard Cadet		Lincoln Sherwood MS (AA)	Sherwood	No champion	No champion	No champion	Sherwood
2019	Sherwood Cadet Tigard Cadet (concert)		Rex Putnam	Sherwood	No champion	No champion	No champion	Sherwood
2020–21	Championships cancelled							
2022	Sherwood Cadet		Rex Putnam Skyview (Standstill A)	Sherwood	No champion	No champion	No champion	Century
2023	Sherwood Cadet Grants Pass Cadet (concert)		Rex Putnam McMinnville (Standstill A)	Kamiak	No champion	Scappoose	No champion	No champion
2024	Sherwood Cadet		Rex Putnam Mountainside (Standstill A)	Sherwood	No champion	No champion	Scappoose	No champion
Year	Cadet	Regional A (PRA)	Marching A (PSA)	Marching Open (PSO)	Marching World (PSW)	Concert A (PSCA)	Concert Open (PSCO)	Winds A (WSA)
2025	Sherwood Cadet Grants Pass Cadet (concert)	Sunset	Glencoe Mountainside (Standstill A)	Kamiak	No champion	No champion	Scappoose	No champion
2026	Sherwood Cadet Grants Pass MS (concert)	Sheldon	Glencoe Century (Standstill A)	Kamiak	No champion	No champion	Scappoose	No champion

=== Independent percussion champions ===
Year	A Class (PIA)	Open Class (PIO)	World Class (PIW)
2001–2005	No results data		
2006	Fusion	No champion	No champion
2007–2011	No results data		
2012	No champion	No champion	OCI
2013	No champion	No champion	OCI
2014	Impulse	No champion	OCI
2015	No champion	No champion	OCI
2016	Impact	No champion	OCI
2017	Impact	No champion	OCI
2018	Impact	No champion	OCI
2019	Affinity	Impact	No champion
2020–21	Championships cancelled		
2022	No champion	Impact	No champion
2023	Sheldon HS	Impact	No champion
2024	No champion	Impact	No champion
2025	No champion	No champion	Impact
2026	Sprague HS	No champion	Impact

== See also ==
- Bands of America
- Southern California School Band and Orchestra Association
- Tournament of Bands
- Western Band Association
