= Heritage High School (Vancouver, Washington) =

School in Washington, United States

Location
- 7825 NE 130th Avenue; Vancouver, Washington; United States; 45°40′46″N 122°32′16″W

Information
- Type: Public 4-year
- Motto: Choose Love, Heritage
- Established: 1999
- School district: Evergreen Public School District
- Principal: Derek Garrison
- Teaching staff: 78.10 (FTE)
- Enrollment: 1,569 (2024-2025)
- Student to teacher ratio: 20.09
- Colors: Purple & White & Gray
- Mascot: Timberwolf
- Website: sites.google.com/evergreenps.org/heritage

Heritage High School (HHS) is a high school in Vancouver, Washington. Built in 1999, it has grown to the 24th largest school in the entirety of the state, at approximately 2,200 students. The school is represented with the colors purple, gray, and white, as well as mascot Terry the Timberwolf.

== Athletics ==
- Baseball
  - League Champions: 2007, 2008
  - District Champions: 2007
- Basketball (Boys)
  - District Champions: 2009
- Cheerleading
  - State Champions: 2002, 2006, 2007, 2008, 2009, 2010 (Grand Champions)
  - USA National Champions: 2009
- Cross Country (Boys)
  - League Champions: 2001, 2003, 2005, 2006, 2007
  - District Champions: 2003, 2005, 2006, 2007
  - State Meet appearances: 2002, 2003, 2005, 2006, 2015
- Cross Country (Girls)
  - League Champions: 2003, 2004, 2005
  - District Champions: 2002, 2004
  - State Meet appearances: 2002, 2004
- Dance Team
  - State Champions: 2007, 2008, 2009
  - PacWest National Champions: 2009
- Football
  - League Champions: 2001, 2008
- Golf (Boys)
  - League Champions: 2000, 2005, 2007
  - District Champions: 2007
- Gymnastics
  - League Champions: 2002
  - District Champions: 2001, 2002
- Boys Soccer
  - League Champions: 2004
- Soccer (Girls)
  - District Champions: 2007
- Softball
  - League Champions: 2002
  - District Champions: 2001
- Tennis (Boys)
  - District Champions: 2005
- Track (Boys)
  - State Track Champions: 2008
  - League Champions: 2002, 2003, 2004
  - District Champions: 2002, 2003
- Track (Girls)
  - League Champions: 2001, 2002, 2003, 2004, 2007
  - District Champions: 2002, 2003, 2004, 2007
- Volleyball
  - League Champions: 2003, 2004
  - District Champions: 2003, 2004, 2006
- Wrestling
  - State Champions: 2003
  - League Champions: 2000, 2001, 2002, 2003, 2004, 2006, 2007, 2008
  - District Champions: 2000, 2001, 2002, 2003, 2004, 2006, 2007

== Controversies ==
=== Sex with students ===
Tyler J. Benedict, a band teacher who had worked at the school for 3 years, was arrested on suspicion of first-degree sexual misconduct with a minor on July 31, 2010. The minor in question was a 17-year-old female student of his that had known him since her freshman year. The case began when the victim's parents discovered inappropriate text messages between Benedict and their daughter and reported it to the police. Her and Benedict both confessed to being in a romantic, sexual relationship and that they committed sex acts on 2 separate occasions within the summer. On August 3, he was released from custody with a no contact order restricting him from having any contact with female minors and prohibiting him from going anywhere where children congregate. The Evergreen Public School District then placed him on administrative leave. On October 7, 2010, Tyler J. Benedict pleaded guilty to 1 count of sexual misconduct with a minor in the first-degree. He was sentenced to 9 months in jail, 1 year of community supervision, and had to register as a sex offender for 10 years. His last day of employment at Heritage High School was October 14, 2010.

=== Bomb threats ===
February 4, 2008, a note was discovered in a bathroom of the school that had threats of blowing up the school. Later, a suspicious backpack was found lying near a portable classroom. Police were called to the scene and originally allowed students to remain in their classes while they swept the school for explosives. But after they determined a full search of the school was necessary, students were forced to evacuate the building. The building was found to be safe, and classes resumed as usual the next day.

October 14, 2014, a call was made to the school about a bomb being at or near the school. The school immediately went into lockdown and all access points to the school were closed to anyone lacking police permission. Parents attempting to pick up their children up were asked to wait at a former Albertsons nearby to eliminate any danger of interference or injury. After a thorough search of the school, the police found nothing suspicious and lifted the lockdown at 4 pm, an hour later than the usual dismissal time.

April 24, 2023, an object resembling a bomb was discovered in the courtyard area of the school and promptly triggered a lockdown. The Metropolitan Explosive Disposal Unit was contacted and removed the object from the school after determining it to be harmless.

October 15, 2024, a student was detained for making a threat on Snapchat to "blow up" the school. The student's locker and backpack were searched and nothing of suspicion was found.

=== Arson ===
August 9, 2015, 2 anonymous juveniles were suspected of setting fire to areas of dry grass around the school, causing up to $500 in damages. No charges were ever filed.

=== Tuberculosis spread ===
June 4, 2020, a student/faculty member of Heritage was suspected to be carrying Tuberculosis. June 6, the case was confirmed by the Clark County Public Health Department. The department was then forced to attempt to reach out to the 150 individuals that could've been exposed to TB. The likelihood of the disease spreading was considered low at the time, and no evidence of any other cases were found within the school.

=== Gang-related shooting ===
February 18, 2022, a male teenager was shot off-campus just two blocks south of the high school. This thrusted the school into a lockout situation which lasted 40 minutes. The principal, Derek Garrison, later said that the lockout was just a precaution and the students on the campus were safe and out of danger. Deputies who came to the scene stated a large crowd of 20-30 Heritage students surrounded the injured individual. The teen was taken to the hospital and treated for a gunshot wound to the upper arm. The cause of the shooting was later determined to be from an ongoing war between rival gang members.

=== Knife fights ===
On February 25, 2022, Xavier Echevarria (a student of Mountain View High School (Washington)), arrived at Heritage High School. Echevarria went to the school to fight over an alleged accusation made by another student. He was driven there by a Heritage student. During the fight, Echevarria pulled out a knife, 6 inches and hooked, and accidentally cut himself in the left arm. A student involved in the fight had been sliced in the left side. Another student also sustained a minor injury in the fight, but this was found to be unrelated to the knife. The injuries were all non-life-threatening. The police were called shortly after the dispute and Echevarria was transported to a local hospital. His laceration required 16 stitches. The incident was originally believed to related to the gang violence around the school just a week before, but the Clark County Sheriff's Department (Washington) found no evidence of any connection. Echevarria was later brought to court on suspicion of first-degree assault and possessing a dangerous weapon on a school campus. Echevarria was held at juvenile detention with a bail set at $20,000, and his court date was on March 11, 2022.

February 17, 2026, a female sophomore student stabbed a 15 year old girl in the bathroom. The victim was able to fight off her attacker and escape the bathoom, where school security kept the attacker until police deputies reached the scene. The victim was treated at Heritage before receiving follow-up treatment at a local hospital.

=== Gun on school property ===
May 26, 2022, school staff found and confiscated a gun discovered in a student's backpack. The gun was unloaded. The student was arrested for possession of a dangerous weapon on school property and brought to a juvenile detention center. He was found to have no ill intent with the weapon towards himself or others and released.

=== Swatting attempt ===
On November 22, 2022, 911 received a concerning call describing a shooting occurring at the school. The caller claimed to be a teacher who had witnessed 7 students shot during an active shooting event. A deputy arrived on the scene within 2 minutes, and 5 more arrived less than a minute later along with several other law enforcement agencies. They quickly realized there was no danger or threat present at the school and left. The caller reportedly sounded like an individual who had made a similar false report about a shooting occurring at the Henrietta Lacks Health and Bioscience High School in September of the same year. At least 4 other schools within western Washington received similar threats within 2022.

=== Shooting threats ===
December 13, 2022, Jesse James Stowell arrived at Heritage and made several threats to bring weapons onto the campus and begin shooting people. Stowell, 18 years old, was a former student and had directed the threats towards people who had been involved in a fight with Stowell's younger sister. Stowell was later arrested off campus after an unnamed staff member followed him. He was detained on site for trespassing. After an investigation, he was arrested for first-degree assault, threats to bomb or harm property/people, and second-degree trespassing. Felony harassment was later added onto his list of charges. His bail was set at $10,000, and his court date was scheduled for December 28, however he was exonerated on December 16.
