= Covington Middle School =

Covington Middle School may refer to:

- Covington Middle School - Covington Community School Corporation - Covington, Indiana
- Covington Middle School - Austin Independent School District - Austin, Texas
- Covington Middle School - Evergreen Public Schools - Vancouver, Washington
