= Oregon Crusaders Drum and Bugle Corps =

- Location: Portland, Oregon
- Division: World Class
- Founded: 1971 and 2001
- Inactive: 2019
- Director: Michael Quillen
- Championship titles: DCI Division III: 2004; DCI Open Class: 2012

The Oregon Crusaders Drum and Bugle Corps was a World Class competitive junior drum and bugle corps. Based in Portland, Oregon, the corps is a member of Drum Corps International and was the undefeated Division III champion in 2004 and the undefeated Open Class (formerly Divisions II & III) champion in 2012. On January 13, 2019, the Oregon Crusaders informed DCI that they would not be participating in the 2019 season.

== History ==
The original Oregon Crusaders junior drum and bugle corps was founded in Oregon City in 1971 by brothers Ron and David Jones, with 15-year-old David as Corps Director and 16-year-old Ron as composer, arranger, and drill designer. The first-year corps consisted of a drill team with drumline, and is distinguished for suffering a bus breakdown as its 40 members were en route to the unit's only scheduled performance. The brothers reorganized in 1972, acquiring sponsorship of the Dickinson's Gourmet Preserves Company (now owned by Smuckers) and fielded as Dickinson's Oregon Crusaders. In 1973, the corps merged with the Imperial Cadets and marched as the 115 member Imperial Crusaders, but returned as the Oregon Crusaders in 1974 when the two corps split. After the Jones brothers aged out, the corps lapsed into inactivity.

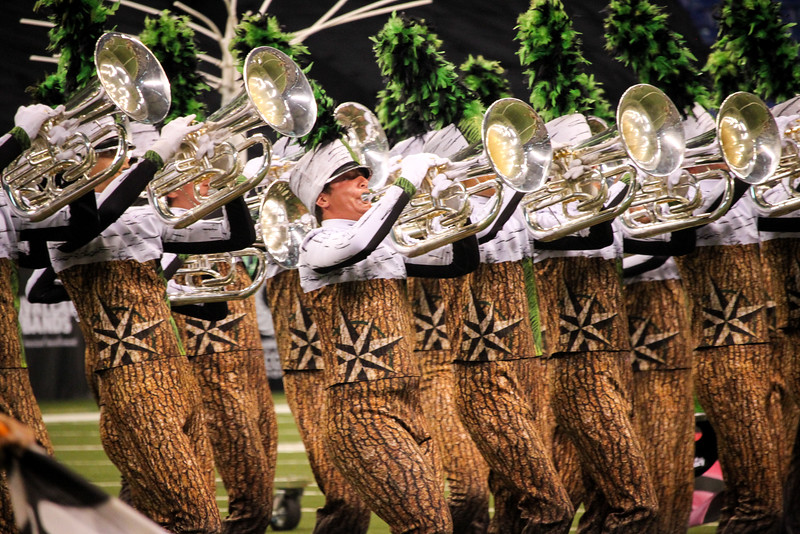
The 2016 Oregon Crusaders

In 1999, Rick Wise inaugurated a corps in Medford then known as the Southern Oregon Crusaders, though not affiliated with the original entity. In 2001, a collection of Southern Oregon Crusaders personnel along with a new group of staff members moved to reorganize the unit. Bill Perkins was named executive director, and Portland, Oregon was designated as the corps' new home. The name was also shortened to, "Oregon Crusaders." In 2002 and 2003 the growing corps performed valiantly throughout the west coast garnering the attention of the larger drum corps community despite fledgling membership and shoestring budget, which would include borrowed uniforms, horns and percussion equipment. In 2004, the corps traveled throughout the Western United States on its way to the DCI World Championships in Denver, where the corps won the Division III title to complete an undefeated season.

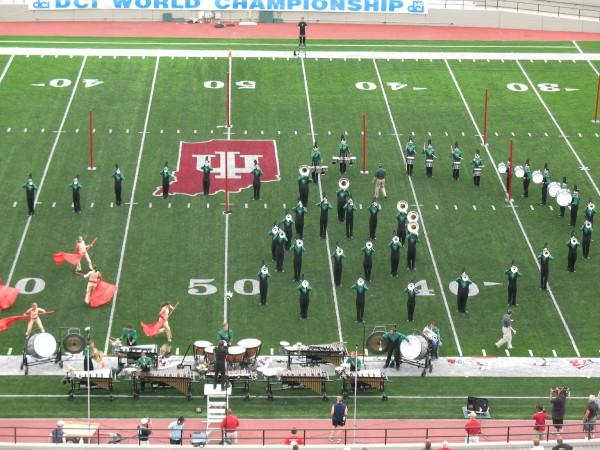
The Oregon Crusaders, 2008.

In seven of the next eight seasons, the corps competed in Division II/Open Class. In 2012, they won the Open Class Division and were later promoted to World Class. On January 13, 2019, The organization announced that it would not be competing in the 2019 season.

The Oregon Crusaders organization also sponsored OC Indoor, which has ensembles that competed in the Northwest Association for Performing Arts and Winter Guard International circuits.

The Oregon Crusaders Independent Percussion Ensemble, organized in 2008, took first place at the 2009 WGI World Championships in the Percussion Independent A (PIA) and finished 3rd in 2010. In the 2011 season, the unit moved into World Class competition and has finished in WGI Independent World Class Finals in 2011, 2013, and 2014. Compass Rose, formerly the Oregon Crusaders Independent Colorguard was a finalist in WGI Independent Open World in 2014 and 2015.

== Show summary (2000–2018) ==
Key
Light blue background indicates DCI Open Class Finalist (Note: From 2004 to 2007, the Oregon Crusaders competed in Division II & III, which have since been renamed Open Class.)
Golden background indicates DCI Open Class Champion
Pale green background indicates DCI World Class Semifinalist

Year	Repertoire	World Championships	
Year	Repertoire	Score	Placement
2000	Music with a Latin Flair; Livin' la Vida Loca by Ricky Martin / Smooth by Carlos Santana and Rob Thomas / Hot, Hot, Hot by Alphonsus Cassell aka Arrow	Did not attend World Championships	
2001	Fantasia 2000; Fifth Symphony by Ludwig van Beethoven / The Sorcerer's Apprentice by Paul Dukas / The Firebird by Igor Stravinsky	Did not attend World Championships	
2002	Stormworks; The Storm, Mourning of Destruction & Rebuilding (from Stormworks) by Stephen Melillo	Did not attend World Championships	
2003	Mysterious Mountain: A Tribute to the Music of Alan Hovhaness; Mysterious Mountain (Symphony 1) & Mount St. Helens Symphony (Symphony 50) by Alan Hovhaness	Did not attend World Championships	
2004	Metro Metal; Bronze: Ride by Samuel Hazo / Silver: Sleep by Eric Whitacre / Gold: Tempered Steel by Charles Rochester Young	65.150	1st Place; Division III
2004	Metro Metal; Bronze: Ride by Samuel Hazo / Silver: Sleep by Eric Whitacre / Gold: Tempered Steel by Charles Rochester Young	87.425	7th Place; Divisions II & III
2005	The Sands of Time; Festival of Light by Stephen Melillo / Vintage by David Gillingham / Original Music by Lewis Norfleet	88.575	7th Place; Division II
2005	The Sands of Time; Festival of Light by Stephen Melillo / Vintage by David Gillingham / Original Music by Lewis Norfleet	88.600	9th Place; Divisions II & III
2006	Echo; Echo by Lewis Norfleet / Snow Caps by Richard Saucedo / Equus by Eric Whitacre	92.675	4th Place; Division II
2007	Gates; 1000 Airplanes on the Roof by Philip Glass / Concerto for Marimba and Orchestra by Ney Rosauro / Acrostic Song (from Final Alice) by David Del Tredici / Wild Nights (from Harmonium) by John Adams	80.750	5th Place; Division III
2008	Inner Connections; Inner Connections by Todd Zimbelman and Nancy Galbraith	93.025	4th Place; Open Class; Finalist
2009	Equilibrium; Philadelphia Stories by Michael Daugherty	87.950	8th Place; Open Class; Finalist
2010	Dance of the Flames; The Dance of the Flames by Arno Elias / Arabian Waltz by Rabih Abou-Khalil / Of Sailors and Whales by W. Francis McBeth / Hope (from The Prayer Cycle) by Jonathon Elias / Kingfishers Catch Fire by John Mackey	94.000	2nd Place; Open Class; Finalist
2011	The Blue Hour; Moonlight Sonata by Ludwig van Beethoven / Blue Shades by Frank Ticheli / A Hymn to a Blue Hour by John Mackey / Variciones Concertantes, Op. 23 by Alberto Ginastera	94.700	2nd Class; Open Class; Finalist
2011	The Blue Hour; Moonlight Sonata by Ludwig van Beethoven / Blue Shades by Frank Ticheli / A Hymn to a Blue Hour by John Mackey / Variciones Concertantes, Op. 23 by Alberto Ginastera	75.150	22nd Place; World Class Semifinalist
2012	Dreaming In Color; Sleep by Eric Whitacre / Detours by Travis Moddison / El Tango de Roxanne (from Moulin Rouge!) by Sting and Mariano Mores, adapted by Craig Armstrong / Libertango by Astor Piazolla / Channel One Suite by Bill Reddie / Rhapsody in Blue by George Gershwin / Fantasia on the Dargason by Gustav Holst / Rondeau (from Abdelazer) by Henry Purcell / Simple Gifts by Joseph Brackett / Kingfishers Catch Fire by John Mackey	95.250	1st Place; Open Class; Champion
2012	Dreaming In Color; Sleep by Eric Whitacre / Detours by Travis Moddison / El Tango de Roxanne (from Moulin Rouge!) by Sting and Mariano Mores, adapted by Craig Armstrong / Libertango by Astor Piazolla / Channel One Suite by Bill Reddie / Rhapsody in Blue by George Gershwin / Fantasia on the Dargason by Gustav Holst / Rondeau (from Abdelazer) by Henry Purcell / Simple Gifts by Joseph Brackett / Kingfishers Catch Fire by John Mackey	77.450	19th Place; World Class Semifinalist
2013	My Heart, My Battle, My Soul; Going Home (from Symphony No. 9) by Antonín Dvořák, adapted by William Arms Fisher / Summertime (from Porgy and Bess) by George Gershwin / House of the Rising Sun (Traditional) / Rolling In The Deep by Adele / Jericho by Morton Gould	81.050	17th Place; World Class Semifinalist
2014	Nevermore; Mind Heist (from Inception) by Zack Hemsey / Huapango by Kevin Walczyk / The Alabados Song by Paul Bissell / The Hymn of Acxiom & My Medea by Vienna Teng / Nocturne, Op. 33 & Medea's Dance of Vengeance. Op. 23A by Samuel Barber	80.100	19th Place; World Class Semifinalist
2015	The Midnight Garden; Cinderella Suite (No. 1, I. Introduction: No 1, III. Quarrel: No 1, VII. Cinderella's Waltz) by Sergei Prokofiev / Lavender's Blue (Traditional) / Who Is She? & Pumpkin Pursuit (from Cinderella) by Patrick Doyle	78.550	17th Place; World Class Semifinalist
2016	Hunted; Hunter by Björk / NO one To kNOW one by Andy Akiho / Who Wants to Live Forever by Brian May (Queen) / Knights of Cydonia by Matt Bellamy (Muse) / Death Hunt by Bernard Herrmann	79.725	18th Place; World Class Semifinalist
2017	EnCompass; Enigma Variations by Edward Elgar / Only Time by Enya / Where The Streets Have No Name by Bono / The Edge by Adam Clayton, & Larry Mullen Jr. (U2)	79.050	20th Place; World Class Semifinalist
2018	REDЯUM; Dies Irae by Hector Berlioz / Music for Strings, Percussion and Celeste by Béla Bartók / Uninvited by Alanis Morissette / Danse Macabre by Camille Saint-Saëns / Midnight and the Stars and You by Harry Woods, Jimmy Campbell and Reg Connelly / Symphony for Organ and Orchestra by Aaron Copland	77.100	22nd Place; World Class Semifinalist
