= Oregon Marching Band =

Marching band of the University of Oregon

Oregon Marching Band "Soundtrack of the Ducks"
- School: University of Oregon
- Location: Eugene, Oregon
- Conference: Big Ten Conference
- Founded: 1908
- Director: Dr. Eric Wiltshire
- Members: 240
- Fight song: "Mighty Oregon"
- Website: omb.uoregon.edu

The Oregon Marching Band (OMB) is the marching band of the University of Oregon in Eugene, Oregon, United States. With over 200 members, it is the largest student organization on campus, and its members come from nearly every department and major at the university. The marching band serves as the foundation for the larger Oregon Athletic Bands organization that includes the Oregon Basketball Band, Winter Drumline, and the Green and Yellow Garter Bands.

The OMB performs at all home football games at Autzen Stadium, selected away games, and bowl games. Other aspects of Oregon athletics, such as women's volleyball, are also supported by the OMB. The OMB also hosts a large high school marching band competition every fall known as the Festival of Bands.

== Organization ==
=== Director of Bands ===
The Director of Bands is in charge of the Department of Bands at the university, teaches/conducts the Oregon Wind Ensemble, and assists with all of the bands in the department. Dr. Dennis Llinás served as an Associate Professor of Music and the Associate Director of Bands at Louisiana State University. He was also the director of the Tiger Band before accepting his position at the Oregon School of Music. Dr. Llinás will be conducting the Star Spangled Banner at home football games.

=== Director of Athletic Bands ===
The Director of Athletic Bands administrates the athletic band program by leading and teaching students, supervising graduate teaching fellows and other assistants, and working with the university and athletic department. This position also serves as an Assistant Director of Bands and Assistant Professor of Instrumental Music Education. The position is held by Dr. Eric Wiltshire, an alumnus of the University of Washington. Along with the athletic bands, Dr. Wiltshire teaches and conducts the Oregon Campus Band.

==== Past directors ====
Director	Title	Years in Position
Albert Perfect	Director, University Bands	1915-1919
John Stehn	Director, University Bands	1929-1950
Ira Lee	Director, Athletic Bands	1950-1956
David Goedecke	Director, Oregon Marching Band	1966-1968
Gene Lewis	Director, Oregon Marching Band	1968-1970
Burnette Dillon	Director, Oregon Marching Band	1970-1975
Gerald Poe	Director, Oregon Marching Band	1976-1982
Bill Norfleet	Interim Director, Oregon Marching Band	1982-1983
Steven Paul	Director, Oregon Marching Band	1983-1989
Patrick Casey	Assistant Director, Oregon Marching Band	1988-1989
David Booth	Director, Oregon Marching Band	1990-1992
Rod Harkins	Director, Oregon Marching Band	1992-1995
Sid Haton	Director, Oregon Marching Band	1995-1999
Todd Zimbelman	Director, Oregon Marching Band	1999-2005
Patrick Carney	Director, Oregon Athletic Bands	2005-2006
Eric Wiltshire	Director, Oregon Athletic Bands	2006–Present

=== Leadership ===
The OMB is largely run by its many student leaders. These include drum majors, section leaders, uniform manager, equipment (truck) crew, garter band members, and the Oregon Athletic Bands Council.

== History ==
- The University of Oregon Band became an official student body organization in 1911, under the president and director Maurice Hyde.
- 2009 – Oregon Marching Band returns to the Rose Bowl. The band reaches 200 members.
- 2010 – Oregon attends the BCS National Championship in Glendale, Arizona. The Green Garter Band performs at the Musical Instrument Museum in Phoenix, Arizona.
- 2011 – The Green Garter Band competes for the first time in the 2011 Reno Jazz Festival and received all superior ratings.
- 2011 - Oregon Marching Band plays at the inaugural Pac-12 Football Championship at Autzen Stadium vs UCLA
- 2012 - Oregon Marching Band returns to the Rose Bowl in Pasadena, California
- 2012 - Nike creates a third version of its marching band uniform for the Oregon Marching Band.
- 2013 - Oregon Marching Band attends the Fiesta Bowl in Glendale, Arizona.
- 2013 - Oregon Basketball Bands attends the Pac-12 Men's Basketball Tournament at the MGM Grand Garden Arena in Las Vegas, NV
- 2013 - Oregon Marching Band attends the Alamo Bowl in San Antonio, Texas.
- 2014 - Oregon Athletic bands adopts "Soundtrack of the Ducks" as their official slogan.
- 2014 - Remembering Eric Humphrey.
- 2014 - Oregon Marching Band plays at the first college football game at Levi's Stadium.
- 2014 - Oregon Marching Band returns to Levi's Stadium for the Pac-12 Championship Game
- 2015 - Oregon Marching Band attends the inaugural College Football Playoff Semifinal Game at the Rose Bowl
- 2015 - Oregon Marching Band attends the inaugural College Football Playoff National Championship Game at AT&T Stadium
- 2015 - Oregon Marching Band attends the Alamo Bowl in San Antonio, Texas.
- 2017 - Oregon Marching Band attends the Las Vegas Bowl in Las Vegas, Nevada.
- 2018 - Oregon Marching Band attends the Redbox Bowl in San Francisco, California.
- 2019 - Oregon Marching Band returns to the Rose Bowl and marches in Rose Parade in Pasadena, California.
- 2021 - Oregon Marching Band attends the Alamo Bowl in San Antonio, Texas
- 2022 - Oregon Marching Band attends the Holiday Bowl in San Diego, California
- 2024 - Oregon Marching Band attends the Fiesta Bowl in Glendale, Arizona

== Songs ==
The Oregon Marching Band plays a wide variety of songs designed to add to the atmosphere of Autzen Stadium's game day. The fight song of the Ducks is former director Albert Perfect's "Mighty Oregon". For the most part, the OMB plays popular tunes from the last 40 years. Some fan favorites include Journey's "Separate Ways", the theme song from Disney's "DuckTales", "Louie Louie"", "Ease On Down The Road" from The Wiz, numerous charts by Earth, Wind & Fire, and dozens of BBQs. Newer additions include "High Hopes", "Winner", and "MoBamba."

=== Fine for BBQ's ===
"Fine For BBQ's", usually referred to as simply "BBQs", is a collection of short stands tunes. Usually played by the band in the stands, some of the longer BBQs, such as "Come on Eileen" and "Walking on Sunshine", are used during pregame, battle of the bands and other performances. The specific songs included have changed over the years as new songs have been added and old ones have been removed. Many of the BBQs are based on popular music. Some recent additions include "Till the World Ends" and "Party Rock Anthem"

=== Prime Cuts ===
"Prime Cuts" is a newer collection of short stand tunes. Usually the band plays these when certain football players make good plays. For example: Marcus Mariota's theme song was "Hawaii Five-O," Vernon Adam's theme song was "California Love," and Justin Herbert's theme song was "300 Violin Orchestra". Other notable songs in the collection include "Shots", "Menace", and "School's Out"

=== Half Time Shows ===
2009

- Guitar Hero: Livin' On A Prayer, More Than A Feeling, Carry On Wayward Son
- Back To The Future

2010

- Queen: Bohemian Rhapsody, Don't Stop Me Now, We Are The Champions
- Music from Avatar

2011

- Van Halen: Jump, Panama, Runnin' With The Devil, Hot For Teacher
- Aladdin: Arabian Nights, Friend Like Me, A Whole New World, Finale
- Pop Show: All Of The Lights, Party Rock Anthem, You Make Me Feel...

2012

- Rock Of Ages: Juke Box Hero/I Love Rock 'N Roll, Pour Some Sugar On Me, We Built This City/We're Not Gonna Take It
- West Side Story
- Gangnam Style

2013

- Fantasmic!
- Maroon 5: This Love, Payphone, Love Somebody, Moves Like Jagger

2014

- Huey Lewis & The News: Hip To Be Square, The Heart Of Rock And Roll, Couple Days Off
- Bruno Mars: Treasure, Marry You, Grenade, Runaway Baby
- Evolution of Dance: Medley of popular dance tunes

2015

- Tribute to Stevie Wonder: Superstition, Uptight, Signed Sealed Delivered, Sir Duke and Isn't She Lovely
- Classical Metal Show: Carmina Burana, Montagues and Capulets, and the Finale to Dvorak's 9th Symphony
- Latin show based on Blue Devils tunes: Legend of the One Eyed Sailor and La Fiesta

2016

- Music from the band Styx
- Tribute to Jimi Hendrix

2017

- The Marvel Cinematic Universe featuring the Marvel Fanfare Theme, Captain America, The Avengers, Thor and Thor The Dark World, Iron Man, and Marvel Recap
- Music of American Composers

2018

- Funk music: Let's Groove by Earth Wind and Fire, Kiss the Sky by Jason Derulo, Love Stoned by Justin Timberlake
- Contemporary Divas: Bang Bang by Ariana Grande, Chandelier by Sia, Destiny's Child Medley featuring Jumpin' Jumpin' and Survivor
- Epic Video Game Themes: Final Fantasy VII: Opening-Bombing Mission, Halo Theme, God of War

2019

- Summer of 1969: Proud Mary by Creedence Clearwater Revival, Evil Ways by Santana, Aquarius/Let the Sunshine In by The 5th Dimension
- The Music of Yes: Owner of a Lonely Heart, Changes, Roundabout
- Tribute of to the Moon Landing: Rocket Man by Elton John, Space Oddity by David Bowie, Eclipse by Pink Floyd
- The Oregon Marching Band also participated in a combined halftime show with the University of Washington Husky Marching Band which included the music from the Summer of 1969 show and added I Want You Back by The Jackson 5

== Uniforms ==
The Oregon Marching Band shares the same rights of their athletics programs in what they wear, giving them access to Nike-designed uniforms. For the 2008-09 season the OMB received a new style of uniforms to replace the older set of uniforms that were used from 2003 through the 2007 season, which included green wool jackets and bib pants that blended into Autzen Stadium's turf and dark green motorcycle helmets, which some fans likened to those worn by Nazi storm troopers during World War II. Those uniforms were a gift in 2003 from University of Oregon alumni and cofounder of Nike Phil Knight. The new band uniforms were designed in partnership with the school's new football and cheerleading uniforms in an effort to give Oregon football game day a brand as well as what they feel is a unique style. The end result put an emphasis on the marching band being "athletic". While the 2003 uniforms met with mixed reactions, including the ire of alumni and donors, the new 2008 uniforms were immediately welcomed.

Like that of the Oregon football team, the marching band's uniform has many levels of customization by pairing different all-Nike equipment together.

== Festival of Bands ==
The Festival of Bands (FOB) is an annual high school marching band competition. Thirty bands from around the northwest compete in a two-round competition, prelims and finals. The festival is coordinated by the OMB members, and raises up to $15,000 for the band. It also serves as a major recruiting opportunity for the OMB.

The festival is frequently held concurrently with NWAPA's annual circuit championships. Years that NWAPA championships are hosted by another school, the Festival of Bands is often NWAPA sanctioned event.

== Oregon Winterguard ==
Relaunced in 2018, the University of Oregon Winterguard competed during the NWAPA winter season in class Independent A. They have performed at numerous events across the Northwest including the NWAPA Winterguard Premier, Columbia River Winter Arts Invitational, Sherwood Winter Showcase, WGI Portland, and NWAPA Championships. Additionally, the winterguard has been the NWAPA Independent A Champions in both 2018 and 2019 as well as a WGI Regional Finalist. Since the cancelation of the NWAPA 2021 winter season, Oregon Winterguard has not made any competitive appearances. The Oregon Winterguard has continued as a class, hosting an exhibition show in March 2023 that featured full winterguard shows from both themselves and the Sheldon High School Winterguard, along with solo and small group performances from members of both groups. Jennifer Freeman is the current director.

== Oregon Athletic Bands Council ==
The Oregon Athletic Bands Council (OABC) is a group of students in the Oregon Marching Band that meets once a week throughout the school year to plan and organize many of the behind-the-scenes and logistical aspects of the Oregon Marching Band and other athletic bands. These aspects include Festival of Bands, winter band banquet, recruiting, and other related events. All members of the athletic bands are welcome to join OABC meetings, allowing all sections of the band to be represented. The council is composed of student leadership; a mix of elected positions and section leaders.

OABC is run by an executive committee composed of the President, Vice President, and the Drum Majors of OMB. The OABC President also meets with the Director of Athletic Bands once a week to discuss band matters and to better coordinate the faculty with the students.

== Other Athletic bands ==
=== Basketball Band ===
The Oregon Basketball Band (OBB) is a group of 80-100 OMB members who perform at all University of Oregon Men's and Women's Basketball home games. The group is auditioned from members of the OMB at the end of marching band season. Prior to January 2011, the OBB played in McArthur Court, better known as "The Pit". On January 13, 2011, the OBB, along with the rest of the OMB, the Oregon Cheerleaders and the Pit Crew, participated in the opening ceremony for the newly opened Matthew Knight Arena before the men's basketball game against USC. In addition to home games, the OBB travels with both the men's and women's teams to the Pac-12 tournaments in Seattle, Washington and Las Vegas, Nevada, respectively, as well as March Madness tournaments.

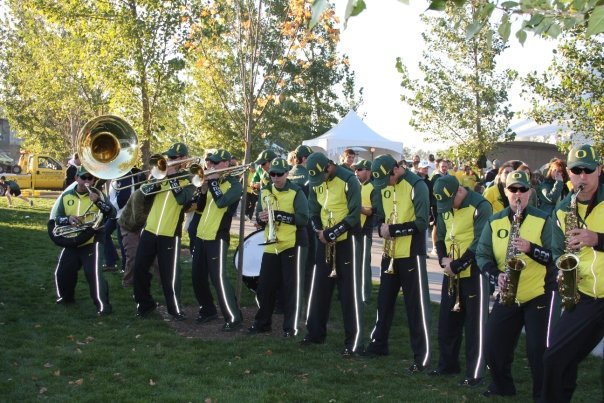
The Green Garter Band tailgating before the start of a football game at Autzen Stadium in Eugene, OR

=== Green Garter Band ===
The Green Garter Band (GGB) is a select group of twelve players that plays at numerous additional events for the University of Oregon. From funk to rock to hip hop, the GGB plays hundreds of high-energy student-arranged songs to entertain the hundreds of thousands they perform to every year. The group has a faculty advisor, the Director of Athletic Bands, but for the most part is entirely run by its student members. The Green Garter Band performs for all UO Women's Volleyball home games, UO Women's Basketball home games, many UO Softball home games and serves as the core unit of the OBB and OMB. Each year, the GGB also gives approximately 20-25 performances at special Athletic Department events, for the UO School of Music and Dance, for the University at large, and at various special events within the community. In return for their large commitment, Green Garter Band members are awarded scholarships equal to about 12 in-state credits. The demand for the GGB is so high that in 2002 the Yellow Garter Band (YGB) was created to help fulfill the number of requests coming in. The Yellow Garter Band is identical to its Green counterpart in most regards, but has a slightly smaller commitment. In return for their commitment, members of the YGB receive a large book scholarship every term. Together, the Green and Yellow Garter Bands have gained recognition and acclaim on campus, in the community and even nationally.

== Discography ==
- 2008 Fighting Duck Spirit 2008 includes Music of Pinball Wizard; Music from the musical Wicked
- 2007 Fighting Duck Spirit 2007 includes Music of Journey; Music of 007
- 2006 Fighting Duck Spirit 2006 includes Disney's Fantasmic; Superheroes: Music from X-Men and Superman
- 2005 Fighting Duck Spirit 2005-06 includes Music from The Incredibles; Rock Show
- 2004 Fighting Duck Spirit 2005 includes Music from Harry Potter; Gershwin Medley
- 2003 Fighting Duck Spirit 2004 includes Music from Pirates of the Caribbean; Call of the Mountain; The Green Garter band
- 2002 Fighting Duck Spirit 2003 includes Music of Earth Wind & Fire; Adiemus: Music of Karl Jenkins
- 2001 Fighting Duck Spirit CD 2002 includes Music of Chicago; Appalachian Spring
- 2000 "Fighting Duck Spirit CD 2001" includes Music from Gladiator
- 1999 "Fighting Duck Spirit CS 2000" includes Music from Star Wars: Episode I
