= Western Band Association =

Youth marching band organization

- Logo
- Abbreviation: WBA
- Formation: 1979; 47 years ago
- Founders: Mike Rubino; Ramiro Barrera; Dan Smith; Gary Runsten; Mel Stratton
- Type: Performing arts organization
- Tax ID no.: 01-0560311
- Legal status: 501(c)(3) organization
- Headquarters: Chino, California
- Region served: California; Nevada; Arizona
- Executive Director: Rob van Loben Sels
- Adjudicator Coordinator: Mike Stone; George Oliviero
- Event Director: Brian Nunez
- Website: westernbands.org
- Formerly called: Western States Marching Band Conference (WSMBC)

The Western Band Association (WBA) is a nonprofit organization that promotes high school music education in California, Arizona and Nevada. Specifically, the WBA organizes marching band competitions for high school students. Its championships event is considered to be one of the largest marching band championships in the United States.

In addition to marching band events, WBA also organizes concert band festivals, symposia, and musical and leadership clinics. In 2008, over 12,000 students in 133 bands performed in WBA events in multiple competitions hosted throughout the state.

== History ==
The Western Band Association was started in 1979 by marching band directors from five Northern and Central California high schools: Mike Rubino (Live Oak High School), Ramiro Barrera (James Logan High School), Dan Smith (Independence High School), Gary Runsten (Modesto High School) and Mel Stratton (Clovis High School).

In 1984, Gary Gilroy (Moreau High School) coined the name "WSMBC" Western States Marching Band Conference, which would later be shortened to WBA by Ramiro Barrera (James Logan High School) in 2002. The first WSMBC Championship was held in conjunction with the 1984 Music Bowl Prelims at James Logan High School. In 1995, John Hannan (Mission Viejo High School) helped expand the organization's efforts to include Southern California bands as well.

In recent years, bands have also competed under the "WBA" banner from nearby states, including Washington, Oregon, and Nevada. The scoring system also grew to become a two-tiered criteria based curriculum designed for bands of various size memberships, assuring that the small band would have the same opportunity as the large band to achieve a high score measuring their unique orchestration and design options.

In 2006, the competition schedule has grown to offer consecutive contests in each of the three Regions (Northern, Central and Southern California) helping to alleviate the costs of travel for the bands.

In 2012, James Logan High School and Ayala High School tied for first place at the WBA Championships, with both scoring 93.40. However, the tie was broken based on Ayala's General Effect score. The tiebreaker settled Ayala as the WBA Champions.

== Marching band circuit ==
The WBA organizes a marching band circuit with competitions held throughout October and November leading up to the circuit championship competition.

=== Historic classes ===
Available classes:

1984–1999	2000–2003	2004–present
A-60	1A	
A-90	1A	
2A
3A	3A	
3A	4A	4A
3A	4A	5A

=== Class alignment ===
Below is an incomplete table of class alignments based on number of performers. Classes were re-aligned in 2021, 2023, and 2024.

Class	2004–2021	2021–2023	2023–2024	2024–present
1A	up to 60	up to 45	up to 50	up to 60
2A	61–80	45–65	51–70	61–80
3A	81–100	65–85	71–90	81–110
4A	101–140	86–115	91–125	111–141
5A	141 or more	116 or more	126 or more	141 to more

=== Championship format ===
Class champions are determined at the conclusion of preliminary competition. After prelims, the bands then move on to one of two finals competitions: the A/AA/AAA Championship and the AAAA/AAAAA Championship. The top three bands from each division move on to their respective championship and the remaining field is filled by the next highest scoring bands.

The Finals field is composed of:

- The top 3 bands from each of Class A, AA, and AAA, then the next highest 6 bands from those 3 classifications combined (regardless of class and score) for a total of 15 bands in finals.
- The top three bands from each of Class AAAA and AAAAA, then the next highest 9 bands from those 2 classifications combined (regardless of class and score) for a total of 15 bands in finals.

== Adjudication ==
Each individual judge is assigned to a specific caption (Individual and Ensemble Music, Individual and Ensemble Visual, General Effect, Auxiliary, and Percussion). General Effect and Music are each worth 30% of the total score, Visual is worth 20%, and Auxiliary and Percussion are each worth 10%.

Awards are released by division. The band with the highest award points for each caption per division is awarded a caption award, while the band with the most overall points in each division is awarded first place-prize. The band with most points in A/AA/AAA combined classes and AAAA/AAAAA combined classes are awarded a "sweepstakes award", with that band removed from the rankings of their class; the next band in placement in that class is moved to "first place" and so on (only for that class). Each competition will have two Sweepstakes winners, one each for A/AA/AAA and AAAA/AAAAA.

== Past champions ==
Below is an incomplete list of past class champions and sweepstakes winners:

=== Class champions ===
Year	1A	2A	3A	4A	—
2000 (17th)	Riverbank	Trabuco Hills	Buchanan	James Logan	
2001 (18th)	Buena	Live Oak	Buchanan	James Logan	
2002 (19th)	Gilroy	Live Oak	Buchanan	James Logan	
2003 (20th)	Newbury Park	Valley Christian	El Toro	Clovis West	
Year	1A	2A	3A	4A	5A
2004 (21st)	Modesto	Live Oak	Valley View	Cerritos	James Logan
2005 (22nd)	Newbury Park	Live Oak	Fred C. Beyer	Trabuco Hills	James Logan
2006 (23rd)	Newbury Park	Independence	Fred C. Beyer	Nogales	James Logan
2007 (24th)	Live Oak	Independence	Fred C. Beyer	Fountain Valley	James Logan
2008 (25th)	Live Oak	Madera South	Fred C. Beyer	El Diamante	James Logan
2009 (26th)	Live Oak	Valley Christian	Los Alamitos	Trabuco Hills	James Logan
2010 (27th)	Live Oak	Clovis North	Los Alamitos	El Diamante	James Logan
2011 (28th)	Peninsula	Clovis North	Basha	Granite Bay	Ayala
2012 (29th)	Damien	Live Oak	Trabuco Hills	El Diamante	Ayala (tie); James Logan
2013 (30th)	Damien	Cerritos	Nogales	El Diamante	Upland
2014 (31st)	Live Oak	Cerritos	Trabuco Hills	Nogales	Ayala
2015 (32nd)	The King's Academy	Cerritos	Clovis East	Granite Bay	Ayala
2016 (33rd)	The King's Academy	Fred C. Beyer	Cerritos	Mission Viejo	James Logan
2017 (34th)	Independence	Kingsburg	Trabuco Hills	Granite Bay	James Logan
2018 (35th)	Championships cancelled				
2019 (36th)	The King's Academy	Oak Grove	Mission Viejo	Clovis North	Chino Hills
2020 (37th)	Season cancelled				
2021 (38th)	Regional championships only				
2022 (39th)	The King's Academy	El Toro	Trabuco Hills	Gahr	Chino Hills
2023 (40th)	The King's Academy	North	Trabuco Hills	Upland	Chino Hills
2024 (41st)	Mission Viejo	Fremont	Trabuco Hills	Clovis North	James Logan
2025 (42nd)	Sobrato	Mission Viejo	The King's Academy	Gahr	James Logan

=== Sweepstakes winners ===
==== Combined 1A–3A Grand Champions ====
Previously known as the Class A/AA Championship.

Year	3rd Place	2nd Place	1st Place
2000 (17th)	Valley Christian	Clayton Valley	Trabuco Hills
2001 (18th)	Bullard	Aliso Niguel	Live Oak
2002 (19th)	Aliso Niguel	Bullard	Live Oak
2003 (20th)	Aliso Niguel	Bullard	Valley Christian
2004 (21st)	Independence	Valley View	Valley Christian
2005 (22nd)	Valley Christian	Aliso Niguel	Fred C. Beyer
2006 (23rd)	Clovis	Valley Christian	Fred C. Beyer
2007 (24th)	Aliso Niguel	Chino Hills	Fred C. Beyer
2008 (25th)	Fred C. Beyer	Clovis East	Aliso Niguel
2009 (26th)	Clovis East	Fred C. Beyer	Los Alamitos
2010 (27th)	Clovis North	Valley Christian	Los Alamitos
2011 (28th)	Valley Christian	Rancho Cucamonga	Basha
2012 (29th)	Los Alamitos	Rancho Cucamonga	Trabuco Hills
2013 (30th)	Los Alamitos	Nogales	Clovis North
2014 (31st)	Chaffey	Cerritos	Trabuco Hills
2015 (32nd)	Live Oak	Clovis East	Cerritos
2016 (33rd)	Los Alamitos	Cerritos	Trabuco Hills
2017 (34th)	Cerritos	Fountain Valley	Trabuco Hills
2018 (35th)	Championships cancelled		
2019 (36th)	Los Alamitos	Rowland	Mission Viejo
2020 (37th)	Season cancelled		
2021 (38th)	Regional championships only		
2022 (39th)	The King's Academy	Fountain Valley	Trabuco Hills
2023 (40th)	Branham	The King's Academy	Trabuco Hills
2024 (41st)	Trabuco Hills	Granite Bay	The King's Academy
2025 (42nd)	Branham	Granite Bay	The King's Academy

==== Combined 4A–5A Grand Champions ====
Previously known as the AAA/AAAA Championship.

Year	3rd Place	2nd Place	1st Place
2000 (17th)	Clovis West	Mission Viejo	James Logan
2001 (18th)	Clovis West	Mission Viejo	James Logan
2002 (19th)	Clovis West	Ayala	James Logan
2003 (20th)	Ayala	Clovis West	Mission Viejo
2004 (21st)	Upland	Mission Viejo	James Logan
2005 (22nd)	Mission Viejo	Upland	James Logan
2006 (23rd)	Ayala	Mission Viejo	James Logan
2007 (24th)	Mission Viejo	Upland	James Logan
2008 (25th)	Ayala	Mission Viejo	James Logan
2009 (26th)	Mission Viejo	Ayala	James Logan
2010 (27th)	Homestead	Mission Viejo	James Logan
2011 (28th)	Upland	James Logan	Ayala
2012 (29th)	El Diamante	Ayala (tie); James Logan	
2013 (30th)	Mission Viejo	James Logan	Upland
2014 (31st)	Mission Viejo	Ayala	James Logan
2015 (32nd)	Upland	James Logan	Ayala
2016 (33rd)	Amador Valley	Homestead	James Logan
2017 (34th)	Homestead	Ayala	James Logan
2018 (35th)	Championships cancelled		
2019 (36th)	Upland	James Logan	Chino Hills
2020 (37th)	Season cancelled		
2021 (38th)	Regional championships only		
2022 (39th)	James Logan	Vista Murrieta	Chino Hills
2023 (40th)	Clovis East	James Logan	Chino Hills
2024 (41st)	Ayala	Chino Hills	James Logan
2025 (42nd)	Gahr	Chino Hills	James Logan

=== 2021 Regional Championships ===
The 2021 season concluded with a series of Regional Championships.

==== James Logan Invitational ====
Class	3rd Place	2nd Place	1st Place
1A	Mountain House	Independence	King's Academy
2A	San Benito	Oak Grove	Santa Teresa
3A	Monta Vista	Branham	Leigh
4A	Lynbrook	Milpitas	Granite Bay
5A	Amador Valley	Homestead	James Logan

==== Kingsburg Viking Classic ====
Class	3rd Place	2nd Place	1st Place
1A	Exeter Union	Templeton	Selma
2A	Hanford	Sunnyside	Madera South
3A	No champion	No champion	Clovis West
4A	Golden West	Kingsburg	Clovis
5A	Lemoore	Clovis East	Clovis North

==== Trabuco Hills Tournament ====
Class	3rd Place	2nd Place	1st Place
1A	Laguna Hills	Torrance	Don Antonio Lugo
2A	Palisades Charter	Mission Viejo	Rowland
3A	Murrieta Valley	El Toro	Mira Costa
4A	La Canada	Trabuco Hills	Upland
5A	Ayala	Vista Murrieta	Chino Hills

== See also ==
- Bands of America
- Northwest Association for Performing Arts
- Southern California School Band and Orchestra Association
- Tournament of Bands
