= Michael Roos =

Estonian-born American football player (born 1982)

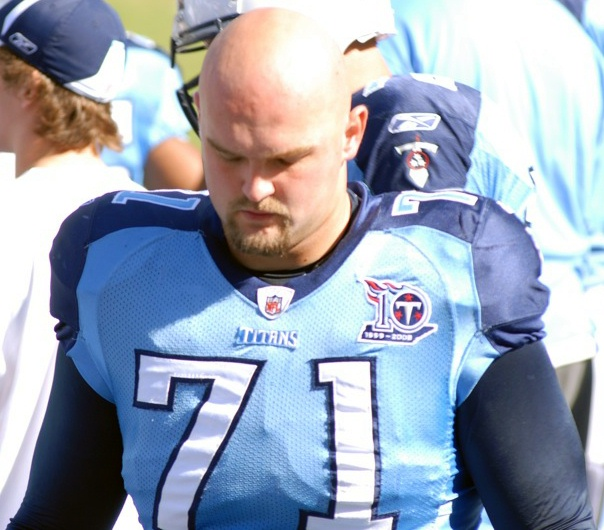
- Roos with the Tennessee Titans in 2008

No. 71
- Position: Offensive tackle

Personal information
- Born: October 5, 1982 (age 44); Taebla, then part of Estonian SSR, Soviet Union
- Listed height: 6 ft 7 in (2.01 m)
- Listed weight: 313 lb (142 kg)

Career information
- High school: Mountain View (Vancouver, Washington, U.S.)
- College: Eastern Washington (2001–2004)
- NFL draft: 2005: 2nd round, 41st overall pick

Career history
- Tennessee Titans (2005–2014)

Awards and highlights
- First-team All-Pro (2008); Second-team All-Pro (2009); Pro Bowl (2008); Eastern Washington Eagles No. 71 retired

Career NFL statistics
- Games played: 148
- Games started: 148
- Fumble recoveries: 1
- Stats at Pro Football Reference

Michael Roos (born Mihkel Roos, October 5, 1982) is an Estonian-born former professional American football offensive tackle who played his entire career for the Tennessee Titans of the National Football League (NFL). He was selected by the Titans in the second round of the 2005 NFL draft. He played college football for the Eastern Washington Eagles.

== Early life ==
Roos was named second-team All-GSHL as tight end at Mountain View High School in Vancouver, Washington after recording 18 receptions for 306 yards and three touchdowns as a senior under head coach Mike Woodward, now head coach of Woodland High School in Woodland, WA. Woodward describes Roos as very "humble and quiet". He also made 40 tackles and two sacks as defensive lineman. More remarkable was the fact that it was the first time in which Roos had played organized football in his life. Roos earned All-League honors for the Mountain View basketball team and also threw javelin for track & field team. He earned scholar-athlete honors three times in basketball, twice in track and once in football.

== College career ==
As a student-athlete at Eastern Washington University, Roos played for the Eastern Washington Eagles football team. He earned numerous honors, including first-team All-American by The NFL Draft Report, American Football Coaches Association and The Sports Network, second-team AP All-American, Division I-AA Offensive Lineman of the Year by The NFL Draft Report, unanimous first-team All-Big Sky Conference and two-time Big Sky All-Academic selection. His fellow right tackle Paul Terrell was also an All-Big Sky Conference pick. He graduated in March 2005 with a double major in finance and economics.

== Professional career ==
Pre-draft measurables
| Height | Weight | Arm length | Hand span | 40-yard dash | 10-yard split | 20-yard split | 20-yard shuttle | Three-cone drill | Vertical jump | Broad jump | Bench press |
|---|---|---|---|---|---|---|---|---|---|---|---|
| 6 ft 6 5/8 in (2.00 m) | 320 lb (145 kg) | 32 in (0.81 m) | 9 1/8 in (0.23 m) | 5.15 s | 1.90 s | 3.12 s | 4.50 s | 7.72 s | 29.0 in (0.74 m) | 8 ft 1 in (2.46 m) | 20 reps |
All values from NFL Combine/Pro Day

Initially projected as a late third rounder, Roos was selected with 41st overall pick in the second round of the 2005 NFL draft out of Eastern Washington. This made him the first Division I-AA player to be drafted that season and the highest draft pick ever to come out of Eastern Washington. In 2008, Roos was elected to the Pro Bowl and was first-team All Pro.

On April 26, 2008, Roos signed a six-year, $43 million extension with the Tennessee Titans.

On February 27, 2015, Roos retired from the NFL. He finished his career starting all 148 games he played.

== Curling ==
Since retirement from professional football, Roos has picked up the sport of curling. In March 2018 Jared Allen formed a team of all retired NFL players, recruiting Roos, Marc Bulger and Keith Bulluck with the goal of representing the United States at the 2022 Winter Olympics. They have since played together in the 2019 USA Men's Challenge Round (qualification event for the United States Men's Curling Championship) and Ed Werenich Golden Wrench Classic (a World Curling Tour event), going winless in both events.

== Personal life ==
Although born in Estonia, Roos has since forgotten Estonian. He immigrated to Vancouver, Washington in 1992, with his mother and his two siblings, where they lived with an aunt. He is married to his college girlfriend, Katherine Fossett. Together they donated $500,000 to their alma mater, Eastern Washington University, to "jump start" the school's stadium project, which included converting their football stadium from natural grass to red turf. Because of the gesture of Roos and his wife, Eastern Washington University's Board Of Trustees approved a name change of their stadium to Roos Field.
