= Ruben S. Ayala High School =

High school in Chino Hills, California, U.S.

Location
- 14255 Peyton Avenue; Chino Hills, California 91709; United States; 33°59′40″N 117°43′51″W

Information
- Funding type: Public high school
- Motto: Home of the Bulldogs; Dare to be G.R.E.A.T
- Established: 1990
- School district: Chino Valley Unified School District
- NCES District ID: 0608460
- NCES School ID: 060846009757
- Principal: Diana Yarboi
- Teaching staff: 99.76 FTE
- Grades: 9-12
- Enrollment: 2,529 (2023–2024)
- Student to teacher ratio: 25.35
- Hours in school day: 6 hours 47 minutes (Tuesday-Friday); 5 hours 57 minutes (Monday)
- Campus size: 46 acres (19 ha)
- Campus type: Suburban
- Colors: Red, black, and silver
- Athletics: Football, Cross Country, Tennis, Volleyball, Water Polo, Golf, Basketball, Soccer, Wrestling, Swimming, Track and Field, Softball, Baseball, Marching Band
- Athletics conference: Palomares League
- Mascot: Bulldogs
- Rivals: Chino Hills High School
- Newspaper: Bulldog Times
- Yearbook: The Outlook
- Feeder to: Canyon Hills Junior High School
- Website: ayala.chino.k12.ca.us

Senator Ruben S. Ayala Senior High School, often abbreviated as Ayala High School or AHS, is located in Chino Hills, California. It is one of the four comprehensive high schools in the Chino Valley Unified School District. The school was established in 1990 and named after California state senator Ruben S. Ayala. It received the 2011 California Distinguished School award and the 2015 California Gold Ribbon School Award.

== Academics ==
=== Course offerings ===
The school offered 30 AP classes for the 2023–24 year.

=== Class sizes ===
Average class sizes for the 2010–2011 school year:

- English-Language Arts: 27.3
- Mathematics: 24.2
- Science: 30.2
- History-Social Science: 34.7

=== Enrollment trends ===
Enrollment at Ayala High School started at around 1,000 freshmen and sophomores in 1991 and grew to 3,696 students before Chino Hills High School opened in 2001. After that, enrollment dropped to around 2,400 students, with a graduating class of about 600 students each year.

=== Test scores ===
Of the 500 AP exams given out to 300 students in the 2010–2011 school year, 2.20% scored 3 or above.

The following table lists the percentage of students who scored Proficient or above on their STAR Test.

% of students who scored Proficient or above on STAR Test
Year	English	Mathematics	Science	History
2004–2005	60.08%	44.89%	33.77%	40.37%
2005–2006	58.4%	40.14%	42.1%	38.9%
2006–2007	62.7%	40.5%	45.7%	45.9%
2007–2008	63.8%	37.1%	50.8%	47.8%
2008–2009	66.5%	40.1%	54.0%	48.8%
2009–2010	70.2%	46.4%	55.1%	54.6%
2010–2011	70.9%	46.8%	73.3%	56.2%
2011–2012	74.5%	49.2%	72.6%	56.6%

The following are the percentages of students who passed the CAHSEE test in the 10th grade:

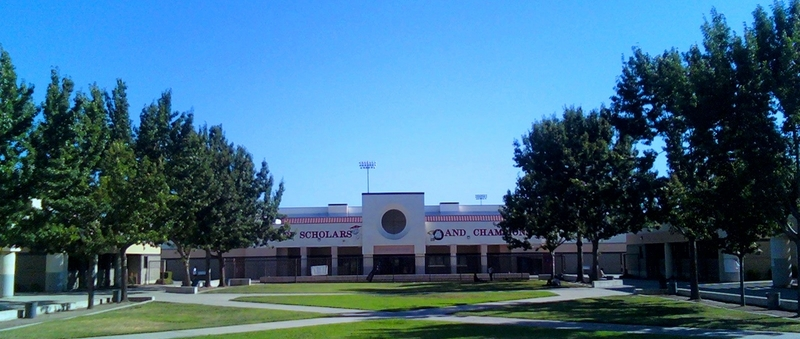
Ayala High School campus

CAHSEE
Year	English	Mathematics
2004–2005	93%	92%
2005–2006	95%	94%
2006–2007	95%	92%
2007–2008	93%	94%
2008–2009	95%	95%
2009–2010	94%	96%
2010–2011	95%	94%
2011–2012	95%	93%

Ayala's API score in the 2011–2012 school year was 845, 13 points up from the year before (2010–2011).

The graduation rate for this school in the 2010–2011 school year was 98.3%.

=== SkillsUSA ===
In the 2010 SkillsUSA California State Conference, nine students received gold medals, seven students received silver medals, and one student received a bronze medal.

== Awards and certifications ==
Ayala High School was ranked 1,183rd in the nation in 2006 by Newsweek.

In April 2010, Ayala's USB Leadership Program received the California Association of Student Leaders Outstanding Activities Program Award. Ayala High School received the 2011 and 2019 California Distinguished School award, 2015 California Gold Ribbon School award, and is accredited by the Western Association of Schools and Colleges.

== Performing arts ==
=== Band and Colorguard ===
Ayala High School Band and Colorguard
- Nickname: Ayala BAC
- School: Ayala High School
- Location: Chino Hills, California, United States
- Assistant Director: Kyle Martinez
- Website: ayalabac.org

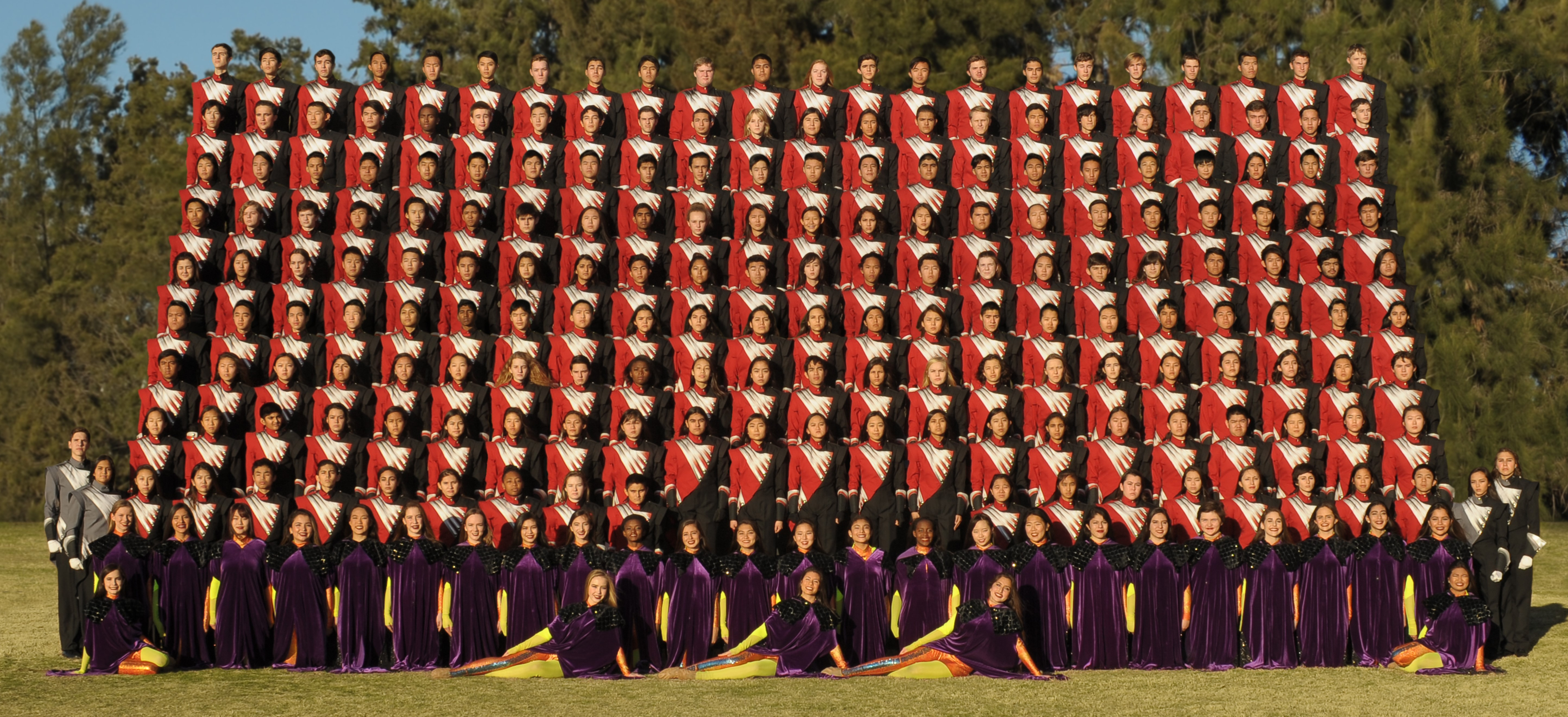
Ayala Band and Colorguard 2015-2016

- The Ayala Band and Colorguard (BAC) is a regionally and nationally recognized performance ensemble. They have attended competitions such as the Western Band Association (WBA) field tournaments and Grand Championships (placing first in the 5A Class division in 2011, 2012, and 2015) as well as attended several Bands of America (BOA) events; Regional Championships since 1999 (placing first in 2006, 2007, 2008, 2009, 2010, 2012, 2013, 2014, 2015, 2018, and 2019 in California, and 2018 in St. George, Utah), Super Regional Championships in 2003 in San Antonio, Texas, and Grand National Championships in Indianapolis, Indiana in 2004, 2007, 2010, 2013, 2016, and 2019 (placing in the top 12 finalists in 2004, 2013, and 2019).
- In 2004, The Ayala BAC attended the Bands of America Grand National Championships in Indianapolis, Indiana, where they were a top 12 finalist. This was their first appearance at the event. As an unpublished category in the music caption score, the percussion section placed first in the finals.
- The Ayala BAC took second place in the 2009 Western Band Association Grand Championships in Fresno, California.
- In the 2010 Bands of America Grand National Championships held in Indianapolis, Indiana, the Ayala BAC placed 18th in semi-finals.
- The Ayala BAC placed first in both the Class 5A competition and the Combined 4A/5A Finals competition in the 2011 Western Band Association Grand Championships in Santa Barbara, California.
- The Ayala BAC was undefeated, winning first place at every field show they competed in during the 2012 season.
- The Ayala BAC tied for first place with James Logan High School in the 5A Class competition of the 2012 Western Band Association Grand Championships in Fresno, California. Due to a tie-breaking rule, which states that in the event of a tie, the band with the higher general effect score is the winner, the Ayala BAC won against James Logan High School, which was the second year in a row that James Logan had placed second to the Ayala BAC.
- In 2014, the Ayala BAC placed first in Class 5A competition, and placed second at the Combined 4A/5A Finals competition in the 2014 Western Band Association Championships.
- In 2015, the Ayala BAC's win at the Bands of America Regional Championship in Long Beach, California set the record for most consecutive Regional Championship wins, with nine, breaking the record of eight held by Centerville High School from Centerville, Ohio. This record was broken the next year by Broken Arrow High School, with 10 consecutive wins.
- In 2015, the Ayala BAC maintained an undefeated season and won first place in both the Class 5A competition and the Combined 4A/5A Finals competition at the 2015 Western Band Association Grand Championships in Fresno, California. The percussion section scored the highest ever score in the percussion caption during finals, with a 9.9.
- 2017 Western Band Association Grand Championships in Fresno, California.
- In the fall of 2018, the Ayala BAC won two consecutive Bands of America Regional Championships for the first time in the program's history, winning both the St. George, Utah Regional Championship and the Southern California Regional Championship in Valley Glen, California. These two wins also make the Ayala BAC the band with the most Regional Championship wins on the West Coast, with a total of 11.
- In 2019, the Ayala BAC won their 12th Bands of America Regional Championship at the California Regional Championship at Bakersfield College, in Bakersfield, California.
- In 2019, the Ayala BAC made their 6th appearance at the Bands of America Grand National Championships in Indianapolis, Indiana, where they were a top 12 finalist. This marks the second time a California band has made three appearances in the competition's Finals since Etiwanda High School did so in the 1990s.

=== Indoor Percussion Ensembles ===
The Ayala Marching Percussion Ensemble and Ayala Concert Percussion Ensemble are nationally recognized winter/indoor performing groups. Both ensembles compete in the Southern California Percussion Alliance (SCPA) and Winter Guard International (WGI) circuits, with the marching ensemble participating in the Percussion Scholastic World (PSW) class and the concert ensemble participating in the Percussion Scholastic Concert World class (PSCW). In 2007, the Concert Percussion Ensemble won the WGI World Championship, receiving the first perfect music score in WGI history.

SCPA and WGI Championship Results (Marching Ensemble Only)
Year	SCPA Placement	SCPA Score	WGI Placement	WGI Score	Class/Division	Notes
2001	1st	95.15	7th	90.80	PSO (Percussion Scholastic Open)	
2002	1st	92.20	2nd	92.65	PSO	
2003	2nd	93.80	8th	87.25	PSW (Percussion Scholastic World)	
2004	2nd	92.95	6th	89.00	PSW	
2005	3rd	88.15	11th	84.90	PSW	
2006	2nd	90.75	6th	90.00	PSW	Tied with Choctawhatchee High School
2007	5th	89.35	12th	86.00	PSW	
2008	2nd	94.10	-	-	PSW	Ayala did not attend WGI Championships
2009	1st	93.60	4th	94.850	PSW	
2010	2nd	93.48	1st	97.175	PSW	
2011	6th	88.20	6th	91.900	PSW	
2012	2nd	92.788	3rd	96.125	PSW	
2013	2nd	93.1625	2nd	95.150	PSW	
2014	2nd	94.113	3rd	96.125	PSW	
2015	1st	94.475	2nd	96.563	PSW	
2016	2nd	93.675	1st	97.013	PSW	
2017	2nd	94.025	3rd	96.075	PSW	
2018	4th	91.950	4th	94.538	PSW	
2019	4th	92.5625	5th	93.963	PSW	
2020	1st	86.950	-	-	PSW	Score reflects the final competition of the season before being cancelled midway to Covid-19 pandemic.
2021	-	-	-	-	-	Season cancelled due to the Covid-19 pandemic
2022	4th	93.313	5th	93.438	PSW	
2023	1st	94.300	1st	97.938	PSW	
2024	1st	94.175	2nd	97.538	PSW	
2025	1st	96.425	1st	99.500	PSW	Ayala achieved a record-breaking high score in all of WGI Percussion history, including all classes/divisions.
2026	3rd	94.450	1st	98.638	PSW	

=== Winterguard ===
- The 2010 JV Guard moved up two divisions in the Western Guard Association of Southern California (WGASC) circuit and up three divisions in the Winter Guard International circuit, and managed to win double gold medals in the 2010 WGASC Championships. The Varsity Guard also placed third at that year's WGASC Championships.
- In 2011, the Varsity Guard was awarded 1st place at a local Winter Guard International Color Guard Regional Championship and 2nd place at the Winter Guard International Color Guard Western Power Regional Championship in San Diego, California.
- In 2019, the Varsity Guard won 1st in World Class at the Winter Guard International Color Guard Regional Championship in Las Vegas, Nevada, as well as WGASC Championships.

== Athletics ==
A documentary was made about the 2010–2011 Ayala wrestling team.

== Notable alumni ==
- K. C. Asiodu – National Football League player for the New Orleans Saints
- Jeff Bajenaru – former MLB baseball pitcher (Chicago White Sox, Arizona Diamondbacks)
- Karen Bardsley – goalkeeper for England women's national football team
- Ryan Bradley – former MLB baseball pitcher (New York Yankees)
- Rebekah Gardner – WNBA player
- Mike Randolph – professional soccer player who played for the Los Angeles Galaxy of Major League Soccer
- Adam Seminaris – professional baseball player
- A Static Lullaby – post-hardcore band from Chino Hills, CA
- Marquise Wilson – actor, Hangin' with Mr Cooper
