= Green Garter Band =

Band of the University of Oregon, US

The Green Garter Band
- School: University of Oregon
- Location: Eugene, Oregon
- Conference: Big Ten Conference
- Founded: 1983
- Director: Malykiah Johnson (GGB), Josie Liascos (YGB)
- Members: 12

The Green Garter Band (GGB) is a group of twelve that plays at numerous events for the University of Oregon. The group has a faculty advisor, the Director of Athletic Bands, but for the most part is run by its student members. The band performs for various UO Athletic events (including all volleyball and basketball games) and serves as the core unit of the Oregon Marching Band (OMB) and Oregon Basketball Band (OBB).

Green Garter Band members are awarded a scholarship of $6,300. Members of GGB's companion group, the Yellow Garter Band, receive a scholarship of $1,350 annually.

== Organization ==
=== History ===
In 2002, the Yellow Garter Band (YGB) was created to help fulfill the number of requests to join the band.

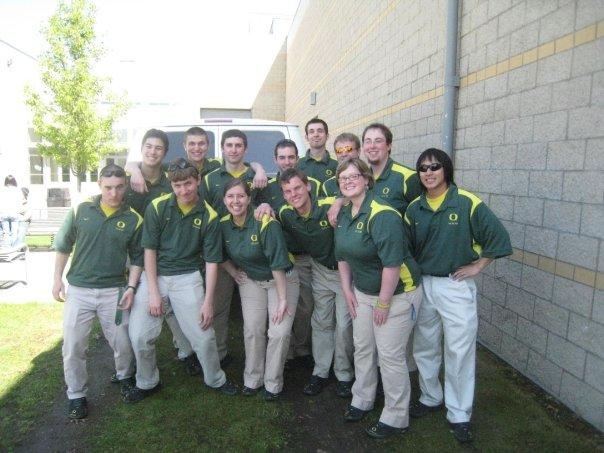
The 2008 Green Garter Band posing for fans after completing a recruiting gig near Portland, OR.

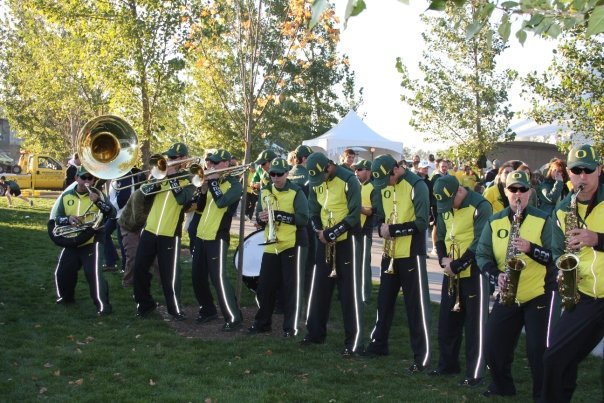
The 2008 Green Garter Band tailgating before the start of a football game at Autzen Stadium in Eugene, OR.

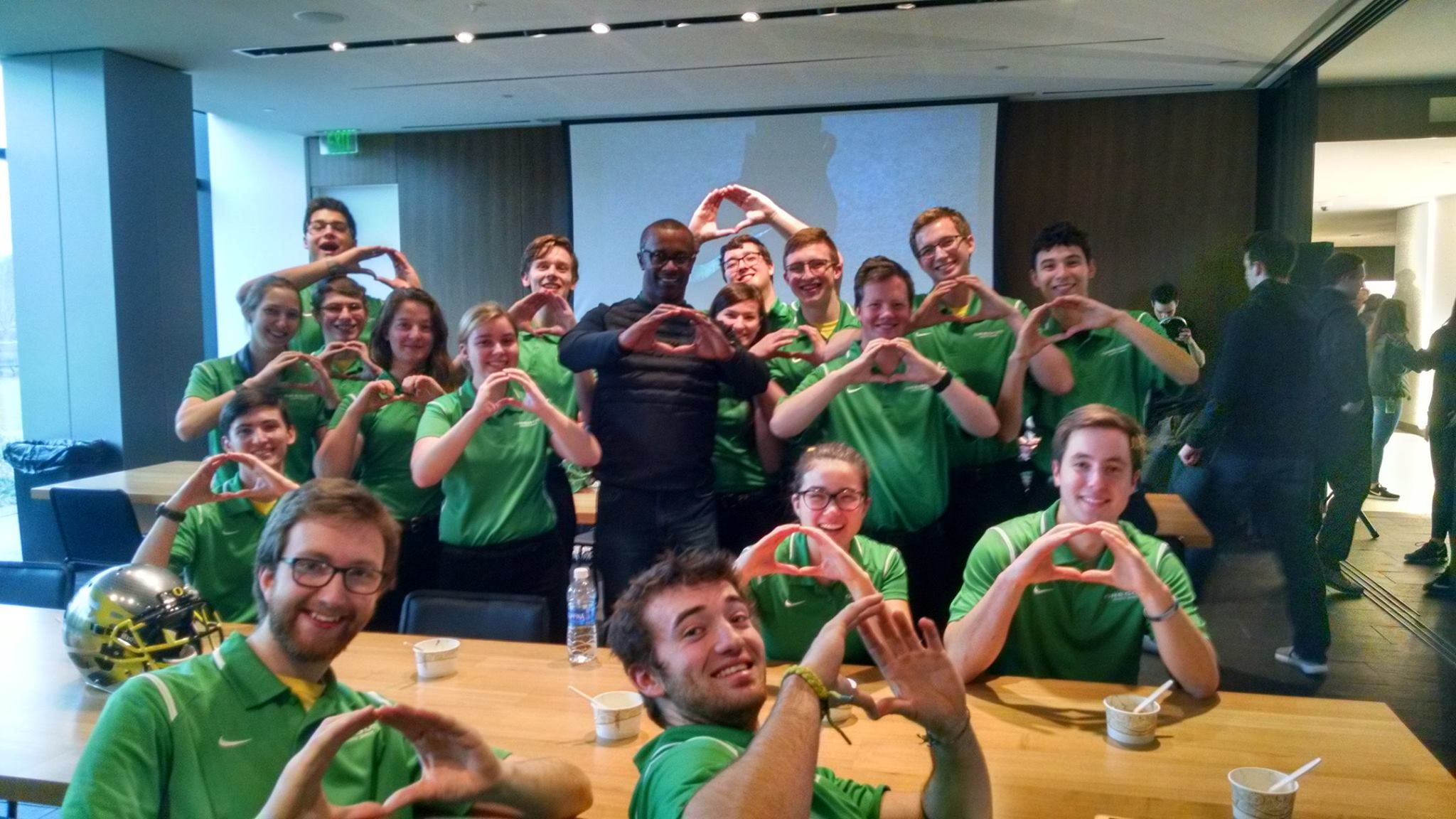
Members of the 2017 Garter Bands meet new head coach Willie Taggart.

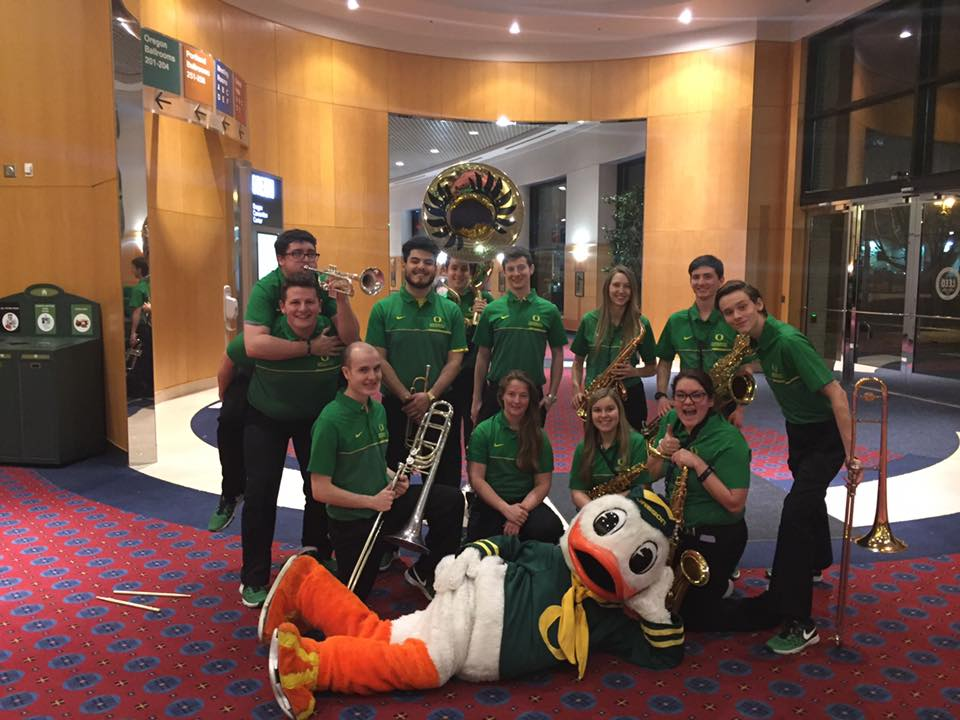
The 2017 Green Garter Band at the 2017 National Signing Day event in Portland

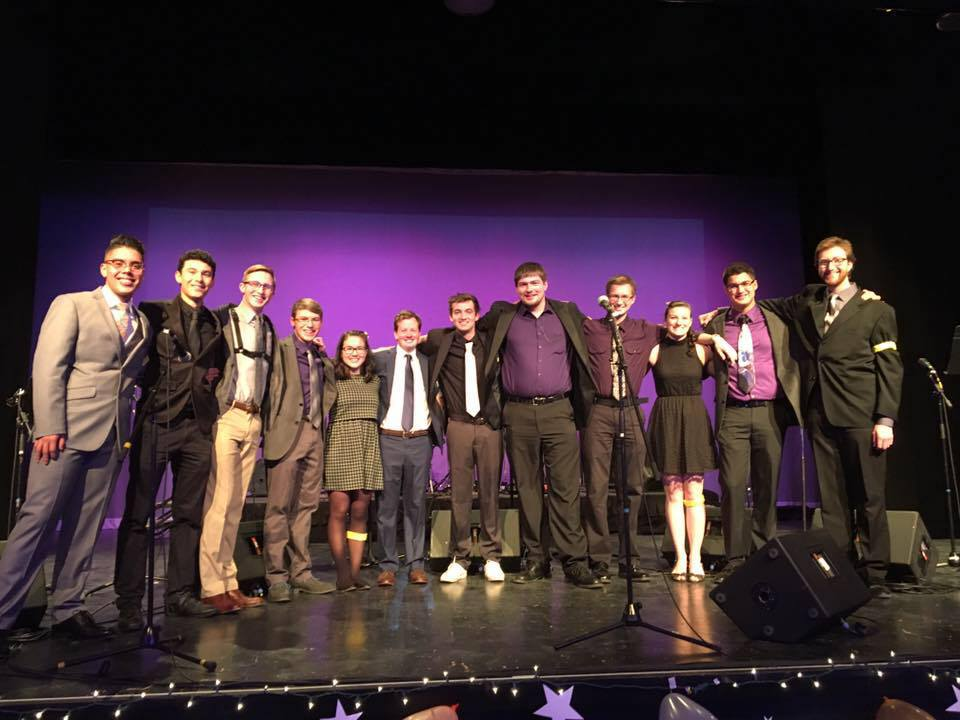
The 2017 Yellow Garter Band before their performance at the annual Oregon Marching Band end-of-year Banquet

=== Members ===
	Alto 1	Alto 2	Tenor	Bari	Lead Tpt	Tpt 2	Tpt 3	Mello	Lead Bone	Bass Bone	Guitar/Keys	Bass	Drums
1983-84	Mary Sipprell	Kathleen Downey	The Mark Baker		Dave Chartrey*	Bill Kester	Mark Wees	Bruce Coutant	Tim Vian	Pat Dixon		John Ingman (Tuba)	Fred Freeman
1984-85	Kathleen Downey	Mark Baker/Karen Gloege	Bill Hoshal		Dana Heitman	Bill Kester	Mark Wees*	Bruce Coutant	Tim Vian	Pat Dixon		John Ingman (Tuba)	Fred Freeman
1985-86	Charlene Decker	Mike Martin	Bill Hoshal	Carl Poole	Dana Heitman	Tim Clarke	Mark Wees*	Bruce Coutant	Tim Vian	Pat Dixon	Andrew Sherman	Rose Dunphey(Connett)	Fred Freeman
1986-87	Francie Kirk	Carl Poole	Bill Hoshal		Dana Heitman*	Tim Clarke	Kelly Coutant (McDonald)	Bruce Coutant	Tim Vian/Todd Kesterson	Cameron Gates	Doug Mathews	Rose Dunphey (Connett)	Fred Freeman/Brad Hirsch
1987-88	Walter Bates	Jerry Farnell	Brian Boggs		Dana Heitman*	Tim Clarke	Kelly Coutant (McDonald)	Bruce Coutant	Todd Kesterson	Cameron Gates		Joe Worley	Brad Hirsch
1988-89	Pat Detroit	Jerry Farnell	Brian Boggs/Andy Nelson	Walter Bates	Dana Heitman*	Todd Zimbelman	Kelly Coutant (McDonald)	Jeff Edom	Todd Kesterson	Wayne Conkey/Pat Dixon		Joe Worley	Mitch Seal/Sean Wagoner
1989-90	Walter Bates/Mike Snyder	Jerry Farnell	Andy Nelson	Kacy Flanagan	Dana Heitman*	Todd Zimbelman	Marie-Francis Downer	Jeff Edom/Karen Tunnell (McDaniel)	Keith Dwiggins	Wayne Conkey	Shawn Johnson/David Schiffer	Joe Worley	Sean Wagoner
1990-91	Mike Snyder	Kacy Flanagan	Andy Nelson/Mike Yake	Eric Howington***	Todd Zimbelman* (split lead)	Tim Allums (split lead)	Marie-Francis Downer/Shawn Brekke	Karen Tunnell (McDaniel)	Bryce Peltier/Shawn Johnson	Shira Fadeley	David Schiffer	Joe Worley	Sean Wagoner
1991-92	Mike Snyder	Tom Herb	Mike Yake	Eric Howington	Todd Zimbelman* (split lead)	Tim Allums (split lead	Jason Garcia	Karen Tunnell (McDaniel)	Shawn Johnson	Shira Fadeley		Aaron Welk	Tim Curle
1992-93	Mike Yake	Tom Herb	Mike Snyder	Eric Howington	Tim Allums*	Jason Garcia	Danny Hunt	Tom Muller	Brian Griffiths	Todd Johnson		Aaron Welk	Tim Curle
1993-94	Mike Yake	Dave Keller	Brian Kinkaid	Jill Plant (Fairchild)	Jason Garcia	Joe Billera	Danny Hunt	Tom Muller	Brian Griffiths	Todd Johnson	Sean Wagoner*	Aaron Welk	Tim Curle
1994-95	Dave Keller	Joe Zant	Derek Kane	Jill Plant (Fairchild)	Jason Garcia*	Joe Billera	Lewis Norfleet	Aaron Shelton	Jeff Johnson	Todd Johnson		Nick Papador	Tim Curle
1995-96	Joe Zant	Kevin Dieker	Derek Kane***	Jill Plant (Fairchild)	Ryan Warren	Joe Billera	Lewis Norfleet*	Aaron Shelton	Jeff Johnson	Ray Severns		Nick Papador	Mike Launius
1996-97	Joe Zant	Kevin Dieker	Derek Kane	Richard Such	Travis Freshner	Gary Plant*	Rebekka Nores (Lattin)	Aaron Shelton	John MacDonald	Ray Severns		Nick Papador	Micah Brusse/John Kalny
1997-98	Richard Such	J.J. Sutton	Derek Kane***	Theron Cross	Travis Freshner	Gary Plant**	Rebekka Nores (Lattin)	Josh Head	John MacDonald*	Ray Severns		Jason Kirby	Micah Brusse
1998-99	Richard Such*	J.J. Sutton	Peter Curcio	Theron Cross***	Brett Bowers	Robby Foster	Josh Head**	Derek Pangelinan	Ray Bacerra	Luke Warren		Jason Kirby	Aaron Xavier (Dyson)
1999-00	Mike Bryan	J.J. Sutton	Peter Curcio***	Tyson Wooters	Brett Bowers	Robby Foster	Josh Head*	Chris Buckley/Chris Rowbotham	Ray Bacerra	Luke Warren		Steve Weems	Aaron Xavier (Dyson)
2000-01	Mike Bryan	Brian Silva	Peter Curcio***	Tyson Wooters**/Paul Matthews	Chris Rowbotham**	Andy Hudock	Josh Head*	Scott Odle	Ryan Chaney	Luke Warren		Steve Weems	David Constantine
2001-02	Brian Silva	Dylan Dwyer/Tim Harrington	Peter Curcio***	Keith Muramatsu	Chris Rowbotham**	Andy Hudock/Jeremy Adams	Josh Head*	Scott Odle	Ryan Chaney	Luke Warren		Aaron Flatten	David Constantine
2002-03	Brian Silva*	Keith Muramatsu***	Tim Harrington	Laura Arthur	Chris Rowbotham**	Jeremy Adams	Josh Head	Jared Reno	Ryan Chaney	Luke Warren	Ruxton Schuh	Aaron Flatten	David Constantine
2003-04	Brian Silva*	Keith Muramatsu***	Tim Harrington	Laura Arthur	Chris Rowbotham**	Jeremy Adams	Michael Thompson	Jared Reno	Donny Brouillette	Luke Warren	Ruxton Schuh	Maeghan Culver	Tom Mulkey
2004-05	Alan Moffett***	Corey Lanini	Tim Harrington	Laura Arthur	Michael Suskin	Jon Clay	Michael Thompson**	Gavin Haworth	Donny Brouillette*	Mike Ragsdale	Bill Marsh	Maeghan Culver	Tom Mulkey
2005-06	Alan Moffett***	Corey Lanini/Gabe Dickinson	Tim Harrington	Alan "Georgia" Cook	Michael Suskin**	Dylan Girard	Michael Thompson	Jordan Bemrose	Alex Poole	Mike Ragsdale*	Bill Marsh	Kevin Tomanka	Brian Schuster
2006-07	Alan Moffett	Josi Hill	Josh Shirley	Allison Drake	Michael Suskin**	Scott Ruby	Michael Thompson*	Jordan Bemrose	Alex Poole	Mike Ragsdale	Aaron Longo	Kevin Tomanka	Jeff Tinsley
2007-08	Porsch Anthony	Josi Hill**/Corey Lanini	Josh Shirley**	Marty Kovach	Austin Fiske	Matt Takimoto	Mike Fisher	Jordan Bemrose	Alex Poole*	Justin Canfield		Tom Wade	Jeff Tinsley
2008-09	Porsch Anthony	Josi Hill	Nathan Irby	Marty Kovach	Austin Fiske	Matt Takimoto*	Mike Fisher	Jordan Bemrose**	Tyson Striley	Justin Canfield		Tom Wade	Jeff Tinsley
2009-10	Jonna Threlkeld	Raimey Hoff	Nathan Irby*	Lauren Wagner	Trevor Jones	Bret Emerson	Nick Sherman	Jerry Xiong	Tyson Striley	Justin Canfield**		Tom Wade	Jeff Tinsley
2010-11	Jonna Threlkeld	Raimey Hoff**	Nathan Irby*	Kevin Hyche	Trevor Jones	Bret Emerson	Matt Dahlquist	Leah Suderman	Tyson Striley	Marisa Smith		Tom Wade	Casey Crane
2011-12	Raimey Hoff*	Sierra Hill	Chris McCurdy	Jake McGrew	Trevor Jones***	Sam Hunt	Matt Dahlquist	Skye Gallagher	Tyson Striley**	Marisa Smith		Gavin Milligan	Casey Crane
2012-13	Raimey Hoff*	Sierra Hill	Chris McCurdy	Jessica Lush	Trevor Jones**	Jeff Bayes	Jasper Walton***	Skye Gallagher	Daniel Hartley	Marisa Smith		Gavin Milligan/Nate Potter	Eric Bloombaum
2013-14	Jenny Horn	Nick Van Eekeren***	Ted Schera	Kaden Christensen	Chase Imai	Jeff Bayes**	Emma Kleck	Arryn Bess	Megan McMillan	Taylor Noah		Nate Potter	Eric Bloombaum*
2014-15	Jonathan Hart	Nick Van Eekeren***	Ted Schera*	Kaden Christensen	Chase Imai	Brian Ruby	Emma Kleck	Arryn Bess/Alexis Garnica	Megan McMillan**	Taylor Noah		Nate Potter	Alex Ford
2015-16	Conner Pavlat	Nick Van Eekeren***	Ted Schera**	Kaden Christensen*/Adam Russell	Chase Imai	Brian Ruby	Alexis Garnica	Carley Hendriks	Michael Graham	Kenny Ross		Josef Ward	David McKean
2016-17	Alexis Rosenberg	Kaitlynn Riehl	Raiko Green	Stephen Haltiner	Alexis Garnica	Brian Ruby	Scott Avzaradel***	Carley Hendriks**	Alan Wood	Kenny Ross*		Andrew Reid	David McKean
2017-18	Alexis Rosenberg	Josh Kuhl	Jesse Natividad	Stephen Haltiner	Bailey Tucker	Scott Avzaradel*	Abigail Hepperle	Carley Hendriks**	Brandon Pressley	Cory Francis		Andrew Reid	Derek Bueffel
2018-19	Tatum Stewart	Josh Kuhl	Jesse Natividad	Paul Espey	Bailey Tucker	Justin Spidell	Austin Gardner	Melanie Nachtmann	Brandon Pressley	Cory Francis		Andrew Reid*	Derek Bueffel**
2019-20	Seth Herron	Elizabeth Wenger	Shayan Tahmaseb*	Paul Espey	Andrew Shoop	Riley White	Justin Spidell	Andrew Donahue	Alex Lopez	Kalin Mark		Cam Whitehead	Joshua Sheetz
2020-21	Seth Harron/Alex Kivett	Elizabeth Wegner	Piper Brooks	Nathan Hughes	Andrew Shoop	Riley White	Michael McCann	Andrew Donahue	Alex Lopez	Kalin Mark		Delos Erickson*	Joshua Sheetz
2021-22	Alex Kivett	Elizabeth Wegner	Piper Brooks	Nathan Hughes	Andrew Shoop	Michael McCann*	Elijah Dillon	Andrew Donahue	Morgan Cross	Zachary Barrows		Delos Erickson**	Paige Iavelli
2022- 23	Alex Kivett	Maura McQuillen**	Jackson White	Nathan Hughes	Andrew Shoop*	Michael McCann*/Torrye Torrance	Elijah Dillon	Nathan Banks	Morgan Cross	Zachary Barrows		Natalie Scharn	Paige Iavelli
2023-24	Alex Kivett/Malykiah Johnson	Maura McQuillen	Jackson White	Sutter Cummings	Ian Sotomayor	Torrye Torrance**/Elijah Dillon	Henry Swint	Nate Kessler**	Caeden Leach	Caleb Sampson*		Cam Leggett	Paige Iavelli
2024-25	Orion Baker	Malykiah Johnson	Sutter Cummings	Maura McQuillen/Skyler Cappelli	Joseph Ingman	Jake McDowell	Henry Swint	Nate Kessler**	Caeden Leach*	Caleb Sampson*/Evan Kuske		Cam Leggett	Ethan Zawodny
2025-26	Orion Baker	Malykiah Johnson*	Sutter Cummings/Paul Zupan	Ashton Jones	Alex Vastano	Coen Huffman	Sarah Bilyeu	Nate Kessler**/Alex Sanchez	Caeden Leach*/Zac Woodruff	Evan Kuske		Alex Notarte (Sousaphone)**	Ethan Zawodny/Josh Lopez
2026-27	Malykiah Johnson*	Isaiah Hoeft	Paul Zupan	Ashton Jones	Alex Vastano	Coen Huffman**	Sarah Bilyeu	Alex Sanchez	Zac Woodruff	Evan Kuske		Alex Notarte (Sousaphone)*	Tony Lee

*musical director **logistical director ***sound engineer/equipment manager

== Instrumentation ==
Instrumentation, one person per part: Alto Sax 1, Alto Sax 2, Tenor Sax, Bari Sax, Trumpet 1, Trumpet 2, Trumpet 3, Mellophone, Lead Trombone, Bass Trombone, Keyboards/Guitar~, Bass Guitar, Drums.

~ GGB has included a Keyboard or Guitar player into the group occasionally. However, this has never been a permanent position.

=== Yellow Garter Band (YGB) ===
In 2002, the Yellow Garter Band (YGB) was created to supplement the Oregon Athletic Bands.
