= K. C. Asiodu =

American football player (born 1986)

No. 50, 94
- Position: Linebacker

Personal information
- Born: November 24, 1986 (age 39); Los Angeles, California, U.S.
- Listed height: 6 ft 3 in (1.91 m)
- Listed weight: 247 lb (112 kg)

Career information
- High school: Ayala (Chino Hills, California)
- College: Central Oklahoma
- NFL draft: 2009: undrafted

Career history
- St. Louis Rams (2009)*; Miami Dolphins (2009)*; St. Louis Rams (2009); New Orleans Saints (2010); Green Bay Packers (2011)*; Chicago Bears (2012)*
- * Offseason or practice squad member only

Awards and highlights
- First-team All-LSC (2008); LSC North Co-Linebacker of the Year (2008)

Career NFL statistics
- Total tackles: 9
- Stats at Pro Football Reference

Ekenemchukwu "K. C." Dennis Asiodu (/ɑːsiˈoʊduː/ AH-see-OH-doo; born November 24, 1986) is an American former professional football player who was a linebacker in the National Football League (NFL). He was signed by the St. Louis Rams as an undrafted free agent in 2009. He played college football at the University of Nevada, Las Vegas and at the University of Central Oklahoma.

Asiodu has been a member of the Green Bay Packers, Miami Dolphins, New Orleans Saints and Chicago Bears.

== Early life ==
Asiodu was a football-track standout at Ayala High School in Chino Hills, California, earning All-Sierra League honors on both sides of the ball as a senior. He scored nine TDs and rushed for more than 800 yards to go with over 600 receiving yards in his final high school season. He also ran the 100- and 200-meter dashes in track.

== College career ==
=== Nevada-Las Vegas ===
In 2004, he redshirted. In 2005, he played 10 games and totaled 26 tackles as a defensive back, including 3.5 TFL and also had one sack and forced one fumble and blocked a punt.

In 2006, he played in 10 games, starting six at linebacker and finished with 35 total tackles, and recovered two fumbles and forced another. Asiodu moved to linebacker in 2006 after spending 2004 and 2005 as a defensive back. He also earned Academic All-Mountain West Conference honors in 2006.

=== Central Oklahoma ===
Asiodu sat out the 2007 season after transferring from UNLV to Division II Central Oklahoma. At UCO, he was named Second-team NCAA Division II All-Super Region 4 as a senior in 2007. He was also a First-team All-Lone Star Conference North Division pick and the Co-Linebacker of the Year after playing in 11 games made 74 tackles (12.5 for a loss) and had 4.5 sacks, 3 interceptions, broke up five passes, forced three fumbles and recovered two fumbles. He returned the three interceptions for 104 yards.

== Professional career ==
=== St. Louis Rams ===
After going undrafted in the 2009 NFL draft Asiodu was signed by the St. Louis Rams as an undrafted free agent. He was waived during final cuts on September 5 and re-signed to the practice squad. The Rams released Asiodu from the practice squad on September 17.

=== Miami Dolphins ===
Asiodu was signed to the practice squad of the Miami Dolphins on September 29 when the team released linebacker Danny Lansanah from the practice squad.

=== St. Louis Rams (second stint) ===
Asiodu was again signed to the St. Louis Rams' practice squad on October 12, 2009. He was subsequently moved to the active roster on October 20. He played in 10 games for the team in 2009, and was waived by the Rams on June 29, 2010 with an injury settlement.

=== New Orleans Saints ===
The New Orleans Saints signed Asiodu to a one-year contract on August 24, 2010.

=== Green Bay Packers ===
The Green Bay Packers signed Asiodu on August 3, 2011. He was waived/injured on August 30.

=== Chicago Bears ===
On August 11, 2012, Asiodu signed with the Chicago Bears. On August 26, the Bears waived Asiodu.
