= Evergreen High School (Vancouver, Washington) =

Coordinates: 45°38′12″N 122°31′32″W

Evergreen High School

Location
- 14300 NE 18th Street; Vancouver, Washington; United States

Information
- Type: Public
- Motto: "It’s A Great Day To Be A Plainsmen!"; "Be the E"
- Established: 1945
- School district: Evergreen Public School District
- Principal: Daniel Orrantia
- Teaching staff: 77.27 (FTE)
- Enrollment: 1,543 (2023-2024)
- Student to teacher ratio: 19.97
- Color: Green Gold
- Mascot: Plainsmen
- Website: https://sites.google.com/evergreenps.org/ehs

Evergreen High School (EHS) is a public high school that is located in Vancouver, Washington. It was founded shortly after the district was formed in 1945, and Evergreen High school was the first high school in the Evergreen Public Schools school district.

== Campus ==
Evergreen High School is located on the largest plot of land in the school district, sharing its land with a middle school, transportation facility, and the district's only football stadium. Previously, Legacy High School and an elementary school were located on the plot too, but these were since demolished and moved to new locations.

== Performing Arts ==
In 2008, the marching band was invited to play at the make-a-wish Presidential Inauguration parade for Barack Obama. Evergreen High School has won more than 250 trophies and awards in the past, for both field and parade marching.

== Athletics ==
Evergreen competes in the Greater St. Helens 3A league.

In 2004, EHS football team became the first 4A team from the Southwest Washington District IV to make a state championship game. After falling behind early 14-0 to Skyline Spartans, the Plainsmen won 28-14 . Running back Taylor Rank stood out for the Plainsmen, carrying the ball 28 times for 211 yards and three touchdowns. Rank played football at the University of South Carolina until graduation in 2009.

=== State championships ===
- Boys Basketball: 1995
- Boys Wrestling: 1997
- Football: 2004
- Girls Bowling: 2017-2020

=== State runners-up ===
- Boys Soccer: 1999
- Girls Bowling: 2016

== Notable alumni ==
- Shalon Baker, former Canadian Football League and Arena Football League player
- Brandon Cantu, two-time World Series of Poker bracelet winner
- Robert Franks, NBA player (Charlotte Hornets)
- Randy Myers, former baseball player (New York Mets, Cincinnati Reds, and other teams)
- Greg Peach, Canadian Football League player of the Hamilton Tiger-Cats
