= Mountain View High School (Washington) =

Coordinates: 45°36′45″N 122°31′06″W

Mountain View High School

Location
- 1500 SE Blairmont Drive; Vancouver, Washington; United States

Information
- Type: Secondary
- Motto: Home of the Mighty Thunder
- Established: 1981
- School district: Evergreen Public Schools
- Principal: Charles Anthony
- Teaching staff: 76.73 (FTE)
- Grades: 9 - 12
- Enrollment: 1,636 (2023-2024)
- Student to teacher ratio: 21.32
- Colors: Blue, Green, and White
- Mascot: Thunderman
- Rivals: Evergreen High School
- Publication: The View
- Website: https://sites.google.com/evergreenps.org/mountain-view

Mountain View High School (MVHS) is a public high school located in Vancouver, Washington. It was the second high school built in the Evergreen Public Schools, and one of four high schools in the area.

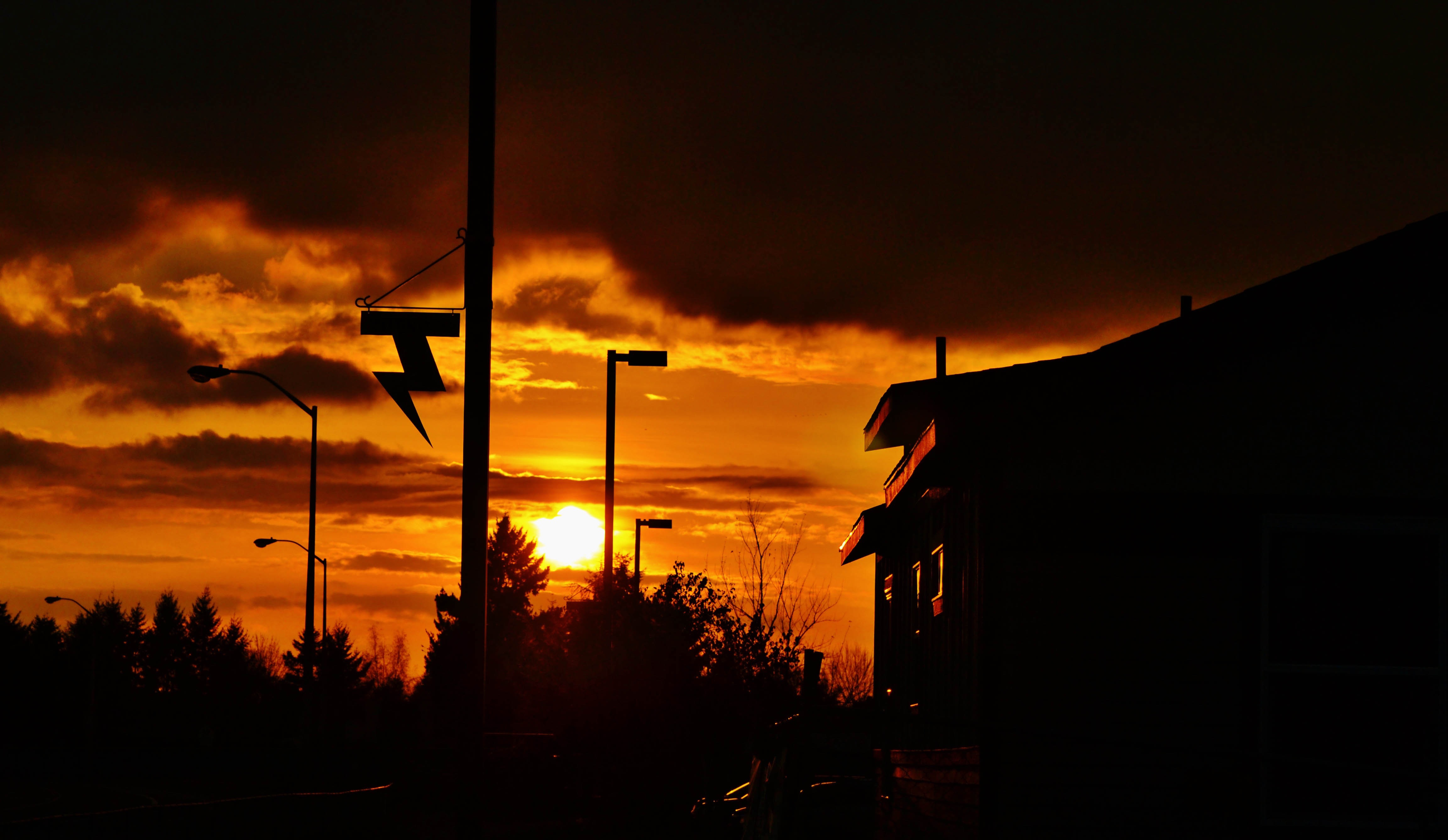
Mountain View Thunder

== History ==
Mountain View was the second high school built in the Evergreen Public Schools, after Evergreen High School. The four high schools share one football stadium, McKenzie Stadium, which is located adjacent to Evergreen High School.

From 2007 to 2009, Mountain View was named by Newsweek as a top public school in America, placing 777 of 1500. This list represented the top 6% of schools in the nation at the time.

In June 2010, Newsweek again listed Mountain View High School in its annual list of "America's Best High Schools," which included 1,600 (about 6 percent) of the nation's high schools. Mountain View was ranked 680th nationally and 11th out of 32 high schools listed in the state of Washington.

In 2012, a need-based food program called Mandy's Pantry opened. It was named in honor of MVHS alumna Mandy Lathim, who died in a traffic accident. The pantry is sustained entirely by donations from the community. Its main community partner is "SHARE of Vancouver" but is also supported by grocery stores, restaurants, businesses and churches in the area.

== Academics ==
Mountain View High School offers a comprehensive curriculum that includes a wide variety of courses, including: career and technical education, English, fine arts, foreign languages, mathematics, physical education, science, social studies, special education, and performing arts.

Mountain View has also introduced and promoted several activities that are designed to help incoming students become successful in their later lives. A well-known example of this is the Thunder Success Academy, or TSA, which has two branches of older students, Thunder Crew, the general workers during the school year, and Thunder Mentors, who not only participate in Thunder Crew, but also attend a summer camp with the freshmen.

TSA has been so successful that other schools in Washington have modeled their own programs after it, in order to make their students feel responsible for each other, though some students just take the program for the .5 credit awarded to each student who takes TSA.

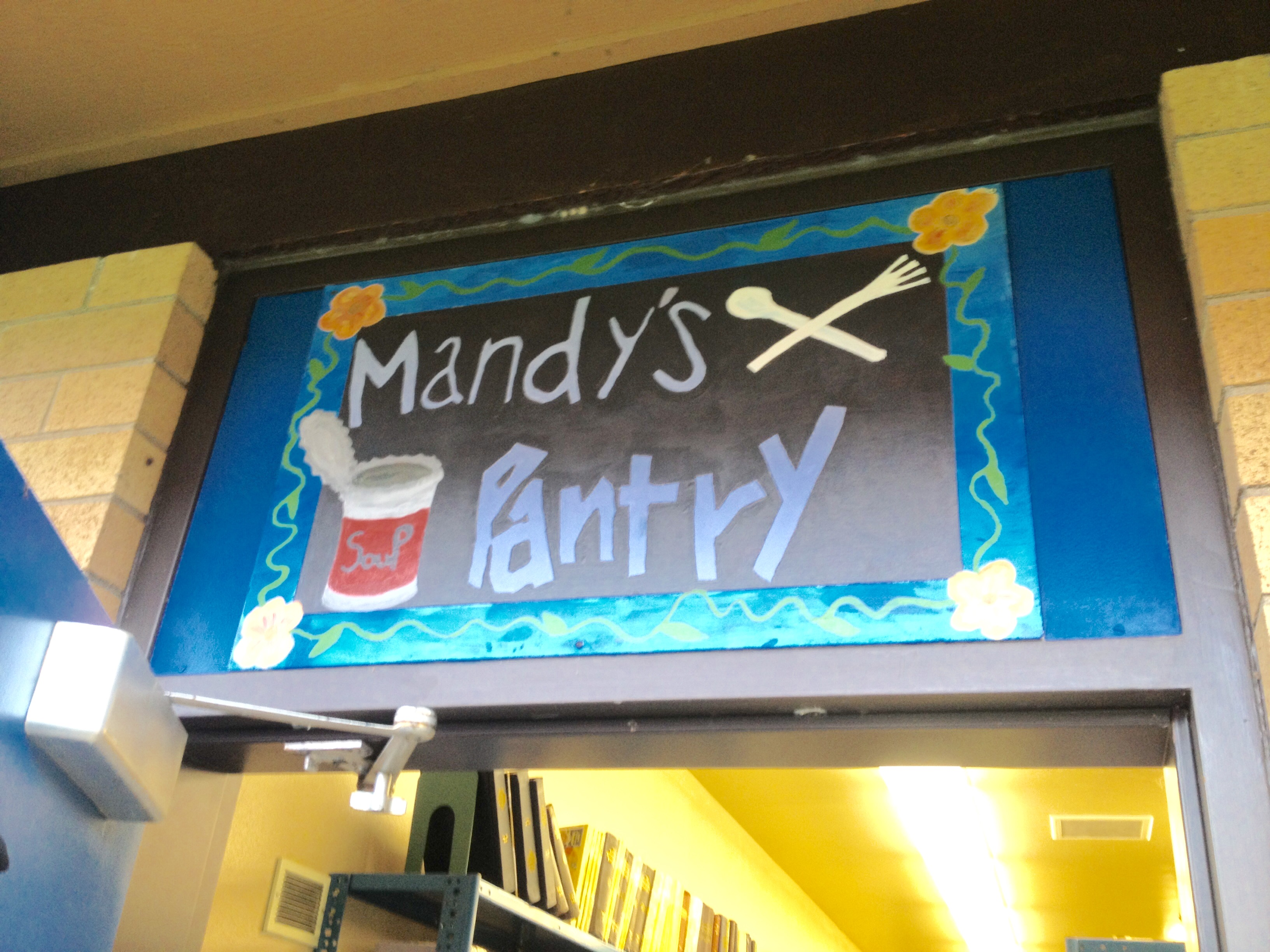
Sign for Mandy's Pantry at Mountain View Highschool in Vancouver, WA

== Performing Arts ==
Mountain View is home to a thriving music program. There are 3 concert bands, 2 jazz bands, two orchestras, one percussion ensemble, several choral groups, and dozens of student-organized chamber ensembles that compete at the Solo & Ensemble Contest.

In December 2011, the school's top Jazz band was invited and had the opportunity to perform at the Midwest Clinic in Chicago, IL. Many of the music groups tour during the year, such as up to Seattle or down to California. In 2013, the Wind Ensemble was accepted as a featured band in the Music for All National Concert Band Festival.

In 2025, the school's top jazz band was invited and will have the opportunity to perform for the second time at the Midwest Clinic in December.

== Athletics ==
Mountain View participates in the Greater St. Helens 3A league and is a member of the Washington Interscholastic Athletics Association. The school colors are royal blue, emerald green, and white. The school's mascot, Thunder, is represented by Thor and Thundra.

Over the past decade, an intense rivalry has developed between Mountain View and Evergreen High School. This rivalry is generally lighthearted, but has been known to spark fights and small riots at sporting events involving the two schools, including recent acts of vandalism to both schools prior to game.

=== State championships ===
- Boys Soccer: 1991, 1992, 1993
- Girls Track: 1989
- Softball: 1994
- Men's Golf: 2018 (Individual), 2024

=== State runners-up ===
- Boys Soccer: 1994
- Boys Tennis: 1995
- Girls Basketball: 1995
- Softball: 2007

== Notable alumni ==
- Daron Alcorn — football player
- Scott Boothby — track and field athlete, Olympic team trials (1996, 2000, 2004), member of 2 USA track and field teams
- Rian Lindell — football, former kicker in the NFL for the Seattle Seahawks and Buffalo Bills
- Derek Raivio — star basketball player, set Clark County scoring records at MVHS, later went on to star at Gonzaga University
- Robert Ramsay — Major League Baseball player for the Seattle Mariners after starring at Washington State University
- Michael Roos — football, graduated in 2000, former left tackle for the Tennessee Titans

== See also ==
- Evergreen Public Schools
