= Legacy High School (Vancouver, Washington) =

Location
- 13300 NE 9th St; Vancouver, Washington 98684; United States; 45°38′16″N 122°31′45″W

Information
- Type: Alternative
- School district: Evergreen Public Schools
- Principal: Andy Schoonover
- Teaching staff: 20.30 (FTE)
- Grades: 9-12
- Enrollment: 316 (2023-2024)
- Student to teacher ratio: 15.57
- Color: Green
- Website: Evergreen Public Schools, Legacy HS

Legacy High School is an alternative high school in Vancouver, Clark County, Washington. Legacy is the only alternative high school in the Evergreen Public Schools school district and has the lowest student enrollment. Legacy High School's principal is Andy Schoonover. Legacy's school colors are green and black.

The school does not have an official mascot. However, unofficial mascots include Sasquatch and Llamas.

== Academics ==
Legacy has a relatively high graduation rate. But based on its moderate state test results, it has received a GreatSchools Rating of 5 out of 10.
