= Henrietta Lacks Health and Bioscience High School =

School in Vancouver, Washington, US

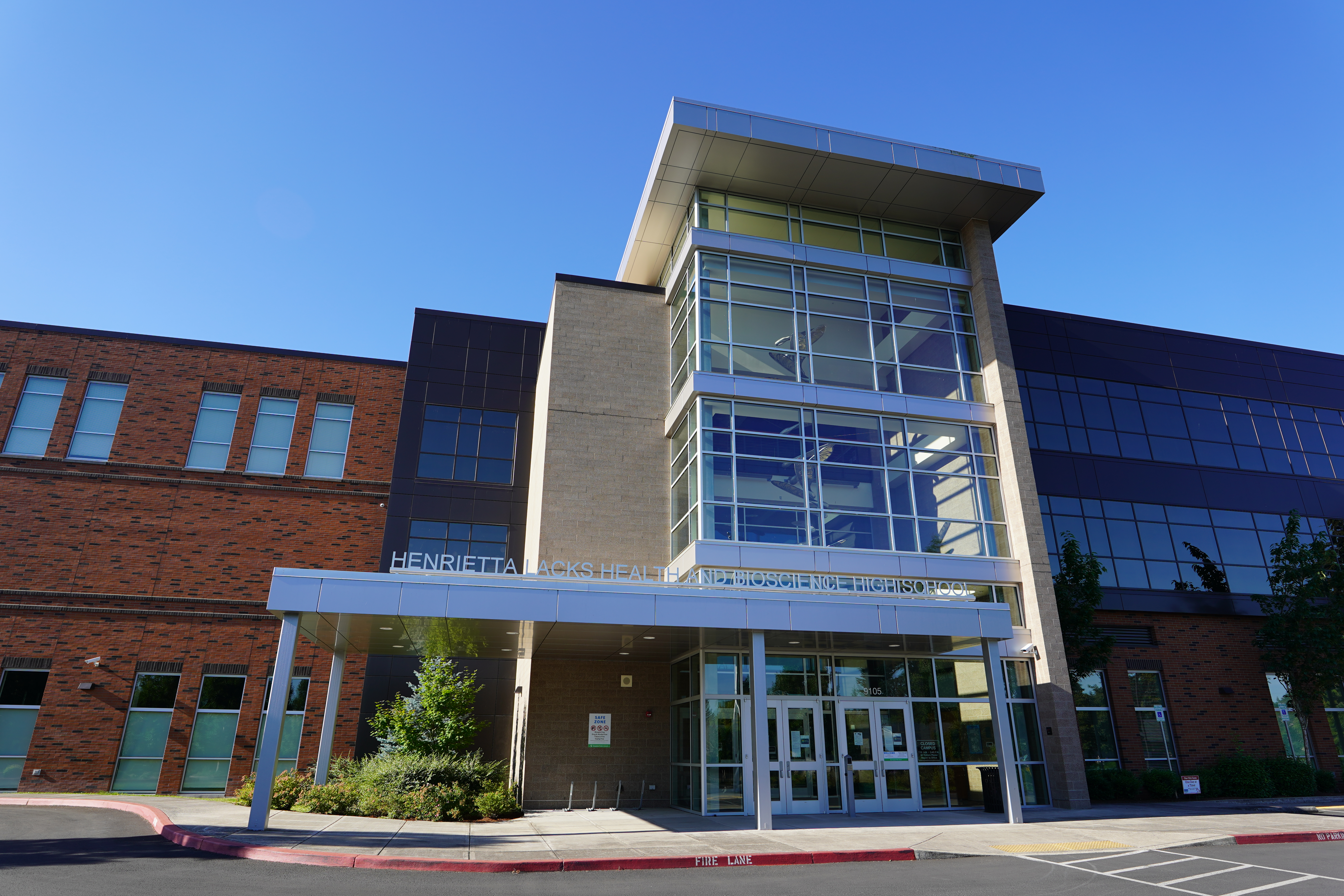
- Main entrance

Location
- 9105 NE 9th ST; Vancouver, Washington; United States; 45.6273°N 122.5794°W

Information
- Type: Secondary
- Motto: Rise Above
- Established: 2013
- School district: Evergreen School District
- Principal: Allison Harding
- Staff: 25.52 (FTE)
- Grades: 9 - 12
- Enrollment: 467 (2024-25)
- Student to teacher ratio: 18.30
- Colors: Blue & White
- Mascot: Phoenix
- Website: https://sites.google.com/evergreenps.org/henrietta-lacks

Henrietta Lacks Health and Bioscience High School, commonly known as HeLa (alternatively spelled He-La), is a high school located in Vancouver, Washington. It is the most recent high school built in the Evergreen Public Schools, and one of six high schools in the district. The school's colors are light blue, dark blue, and grey. The school's mascot is the Phoenix. The school's principal is Allison Harding. The school has 48 staff members.

== History ==
Opening in 2013, HeLa was the sixth high school built in the Evergreen School District. Construction began in 2011. Major funding for the construction of the school came from PeaceHealth Southwest Medical Center as well as numerous other hospitals, clinics, and research facilities in Vancouver, Washington and Portland, Oregon. The school was named after Henrietta Lacks, an African-American woman who was the unwitting donor of medical research cells (derived from a cancerous tumor) which were cultured to create the first known human immortal cell line.

== Academic programs ==
HeLa High offers students a full high school curriculum with a focus on medical careers. Students choose from five program areas, and can participate in job shadows and internships during their junior and senior year.

The five programs of study are:

- Nursing and Patient Services
- Biomedical Engineering
- Pharmacology
- Biotechnology
- Public health

The curriculum includes all of the basic core classes, math, science, English, and history, as well as their specific science electives. HeLa also offers electives including music, digital arts, world languages, and leadership. HeLa High students are supported by an advocacy program called Helix, The Helix program focuses on student achievement, college, and career goals and advisory capstone research projects.

== Sense of Community ==
Students at Henrietta Lacks Health and Bioscience High School come from all over the Evergreen School District. They are given a choice to apply to HeLa, or remain enrolled at their "home" high school (a term used by HeLa students and staff to specify which High School the student is within boundaries for.) Henrietta Lacks Health and Bioscience High School is also much smaller than most of the High schools within their district, with an average of 800 students per school year. This allows students to build strong connections with one another.

== See also ==
- Evergreen Public Schools
- PeaceHealth Southwest Medical Center
- Henrietta Lacks
- Union High School
