= Evergreen Public Schools =

Public school District in Clark County, Washington

Location
- 13413 NE LeRoy Haagen Memorial Drive Vancouver, WA 98684

District information
- Type: Public School District
- Superintendent: Dr. Christine Moloney
- Schools: 38

Students and staff
- Students: 22,127
- Teachers: 1,502

Other information
- Website: www.evergreenps.org

Evergreen Public School No. 114 is a public school district in Clark County, Washington, and serves the city of Vancouver. As of 2024, the district has an enrollment of about 22,000 students.

== Boundary ==
The district includes a section of Vancouver. It also includes most of Five Corners and Orchards as well as small portions of Camas.

== Schools ==
=== High schools (9-12) ===
High School	Established	Enrollment	Mascot	WIAA Classification
Evergreen	1945	1,597	Plainsmen	3A
Henrietta Lacks	2013	572	Phoenix	
Heritage	1999	1,725	Timberwolves	3A
Legacy		200	Sasquatch	
Mountain View	1981	1,744	Thunder	3A
Union	2007	2,030	Titans	4A

=== Middle schools (6-8) ===
- Cascade
- Covington
- Frontier
- Pacific
- Shahala
- Wy'east

=== Elementary schools (K-5) ===
- Burnt Bridge Creek
- Burton
- Columbia Valley
- Crestline
- Ellsworth
- Emerald
- Endeavor
- Fircrest
- Fisher's Landing
- Harmony
- Hearthwood
- Illahee
- Image
- Marrion
- Mill Plain
- Orchards
- Pioneer
- Riverview
- Sifton
- Silver Star
- Sunset
- York

=== Alternative schools ===
Alternative School	Enrollment	Grades	Notes	School Website
Hollingsworth Academy	91	K–12		
Cascadia Technical Academy		9–12	ALE and Skills Center	
Early Childhood Center	67	pre-K		
Home Choice Academy	189	K–12		
Archway Academy-Transition Program				

== Envision Evergreen ==
A $695 million bond measure was passed in February 2018. Combined with state matching funds and impact fees, more than $800 million of construction projects will be completed by 2024. Some of the oldest schools in the district will be rebuilt, while the remainder of the schools will have upgrades and improvements.

In addition to new construction, Evergreen Public Schools is committed to maintaining and improving existing facilities. About $76 million of the bond funds will go towards capital renewal projects.

== School Board ==
Following the May 2026 elections, the members of the school board are Julie Bocanegra, Ginny Gronwoldt, Rob Perkins, Gary Wilson, and Willie Williams III.
