= The Christopher Brothers =

The Christopher Brothers is a band based out of Los Angeles, CA. The band consists of brothers Cameron, Charles, and Ethan. Formed in 2010, the band plays a mix of their own original music, classic rock, and top 40's.

== Beginnings: 2010-2011 ==
In 2010, the band began by playing classic rock songs by the likes of The Beatles, Santana, and Guns N' Roses. As they began to add more songs to their repertoire such as Green Day, The Killers, and current top 40 hits, the band started performing at various locations throughout Los Angeles, including the Santa Monica 3rd Street Promenade and Six Flags Magic Mountain. As the brothers grew more proficient in their instruments they began to write their own music. The very first song they wrote together was "Just Another Day." They self-produced a music video for this song as well. After the success, of their first single they wrote and recorded two more original songs, "What If?" and "Girl You Know I Care." They also produced their own music video for their single "What If?"

== 2011-present ==
The Christopher Brothers began gaining exposure and fans as they began playing at more venues throughout the southern California and the west coast. After releasing their debut EP in 2011 Meet The Christopher Brothers they began receiving much notoriety from local press and indie music blogs throughout the country. Aside from their habitual performances at the 3rd Street Promenade in Santa Monica, they began performing regularly at the Whisky a Go Go in West Hollywood, as well as LEGOLAND California, Six Flags Discovery Kingdom in Vallejo, CA and the Vancouver Wine and Jazz Festival in Vancouver, WA. In the latter half of 2011, they released their third original single "You're The One."
