= Kerry Brady =

American football player (born 1963)

No. 1, 9, 5
- Position: Placekicker

Personal information
- Born: August 27, 1963 (age 63); Vancouver, Washington, U.S.
- Listed height: 6 ft 1 in (1.85 m)
- Listed weight: 205 lb (93 kg)

Career information
- High school: Hudson's Bay (Vancouver, Washington)
- College: Hawaii
- NFL draft: 1987: undrafted

Career history
- Dallas Cowboys (1987); Buffalo Bills (1988)*; Indianapolis Colts (1988); Green Bay Packers (1989)*; Buffalo Bills (1989–1990)
- * Offseason or practice squad member only

Career NFL statistics
- Games played: 6
- Stats at Pro Football Reference

Kerry Patrick Brady (born August 27, 1963) is an American former professional football player who was a placekicker in the National Football League (NFL) for the Dallas Cowboys, Indianapolis Colts, and Buffalo Bills. He played college football for the Hawaii Warriors.

== Early life ==
Brady attended Hudson's Bay High School in Vancouver, Washington, graduating in 1981. He played soccer at Portland Community College in 1981-82 and won two Northwest championships, his soccer coach, Rudi Sommer, watched him kick 60 yard field goals with soccer balls at Civic Stadium and encouraged him to pursue a career in kicking footballs. He accepted a football scholarship from the University of Hawaii.

He was a backup behind Richard Spelman as a sophomore and junior. As a senior, he was named the starter at placekicker, making 16 out of 20 field goals (80%), 20 out of 22 extra points (90.9%) and 68 points.

== Professional career ==
=== Dallas Cowboys ===
Brady was signed as an undrafted free agent by the Dallas Cowboys after the 1987 NFL draft on April 1, who were looking for a replacement for kicker Rafael Septien. On August 25, he was waived after falling behind Roger Ruzek and Luis Zendejas on the depth chart.

After the NFLPA strike was declared on the third week of the 1987 season, those games were canceled (reducing the 16-game season to 15) and the NFL decided that the games would be played with replacement players. On October 17, he was re-signed to replace an injured Zendejas and be a part of the Dallas replacement team that was given the mock name "Rhinestone Cowboys" by the media. He played one game against the Washington Redskins, where he made one extra point. He was released after the strike ended on October 20.

=== Buffalo Bills (first stint) ===
On April 5, 1988, he was signed as a free agent by the Buffalo Bills to compete against Scott Norwood. He was released on August 23.

=== Indianapolis Colts ===
On September 22, 1988, he was signed as a free agent by the Indianapolis Colts to handle the kickoffs, while starter Dean Biasucci focused only on making field goals on the depth chart.

=== Green Bay Packers ===
On April 21, 1989, he was signed as a free agent by the Green Bay Packers to compete for the starting job against rookie Chris Jacke. He was released on August 28.

=== Buffalo Bills (second tint) ===
On September 22, 1989, he was signed as a free agent by the Buffalo Bills to handle the kickoffs instead of Scott Norwood. He appeared in 3 games. In 1990, he was signed to compete against Norwood in training camp. He was placed on the injured reserve list on August 28. He wasn't re-signed after the season.

== Personal life ==
Brady retired from football after four seasons and took a job in sales in the medical field. He is married to Christina Brady and has two children, Dakota and Dylan. Dylan was a placekicker at Brown University.

He currently lives in Long Beach, California and owns a medical device company manufacturing X-Ray aprons.
