= Vancouver iTech Preparatory =

Location
- 16100 NE 50th Ave. Clark County; Vancouver, Clark County, Washington 98686; United States; 45°44′15″N 122°37′20″W

Information
- Motto: Go Ravens!
- Opened: September 2012 (new location opened January 2020)
- School district: Vancouver Public Schools
- Principal: Zachary Tautfest (interim)
- Enrollment: 600 (Summer 2026)
- Rival: Vancouver School of Arts and Academics
- Website: itech.vansd.org

Vancouver iTech Preparatory (iTech Prep) is a public school located in Vancouver, Clark County, Washington. It is located in the Battle Ground Public Schools boundary, but is operated by Vancouver Public Schools. Due to this, 10% of the program's enrollment is reserved for Battle Ground students.

It is a public STEM Magnet school for grades 6-12. The middle school program for grades 6-8 used to be operated at the Jim Parsley Community Center (JPCC) and the high school program for grades 9-12 at the main campus within Washington State University Vancouver.

The school now operates with all grades combined in their new building dedicated 2020.

The school focuses on STEM subjects (classes such as physics, algebra, geometry, pre-calculus, statistics, psychology, sociology, astronomy, environmental science, and zoology) while using project-based learning, where a student is taught something then creates a workpiece that shows that the student learned what was taught.

iTech has in the past worked with WSUV and Clark College to get early college programs available to students who have spent at least 1 semester in the high school program.

The interim principal is Zachary Tautfest and the associate principal is Alex Otoupal.
