= Columbia River High School =

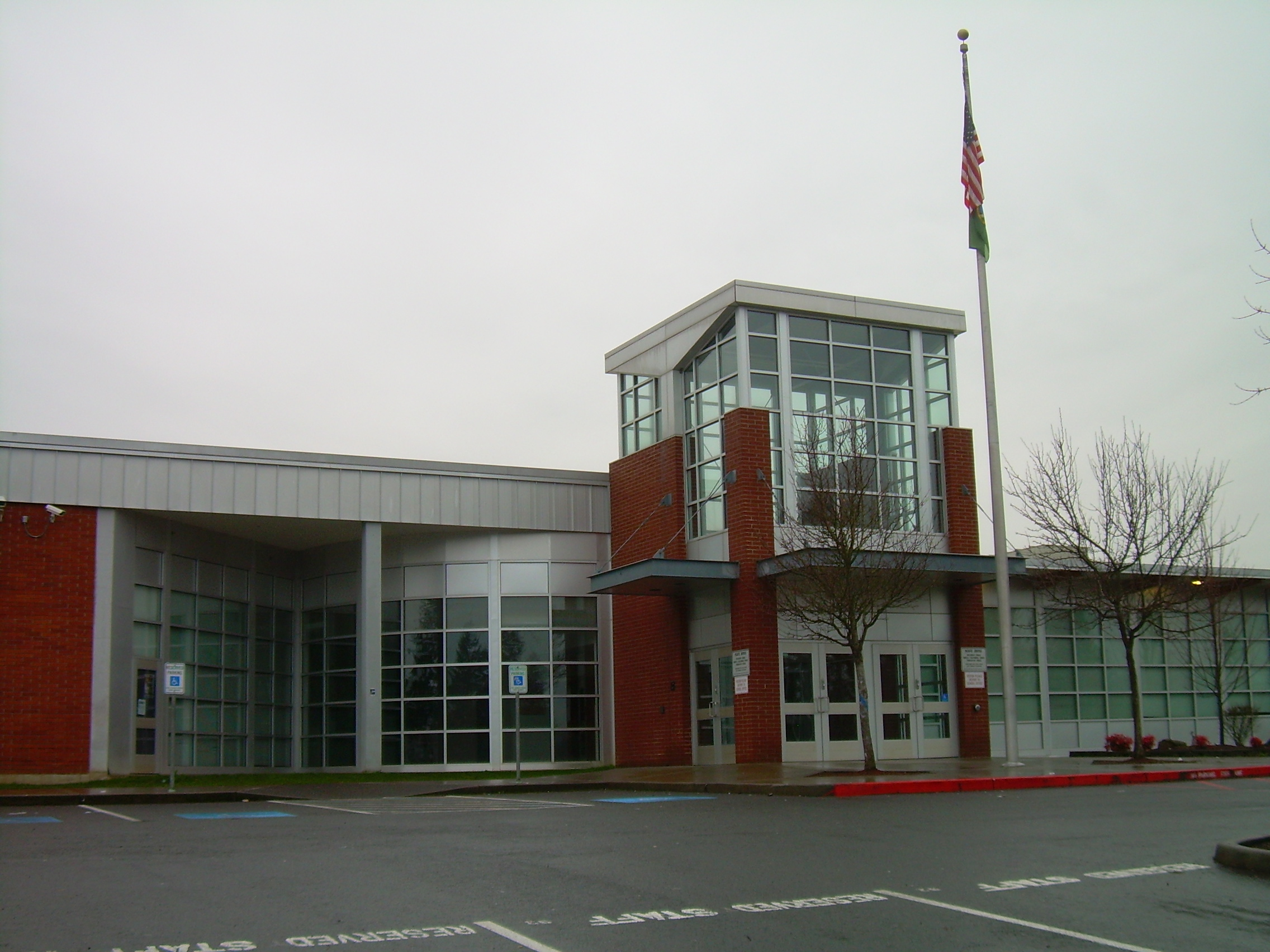
- The main entrance of Columbia River High School in 2006

Location
- 800 NW 99th Street; Vancouver, Washington 98665; United States; 45.694°N 122.679°W

Information
- Type: Public
- Established: 1962; 64 years ago
- NCES School ID: 530927001557
- Principal: Darby Meade
- Staff: 122
- Teaching staff: 55.11 (on an FTE basis)
- Grades: Grade 9-12
- Enrollment: 1,187 (2023–2024)
- Student to teacher ratio: 21.54
- Colors: Purple and Gold
- Sports: Fall: Cross Country, Football, Slow-pitch Softball (G), Soccer (G), Swimming (G), Tennis (B), Golf (B), Volleyball, Cheerleading. Winter: Basketball (B), Swimming (B), Bowling (G), Basketball (G), Gymnastics (G), Wrestling, Cheerleading Spring: Softball, Track and Field, Tennis (G), Baseball, Golf (G), Soccer (B)
- Mascot: Rapids, 2021– (Chieftain, 1962–2020)
- Rival: Skyview High School
- Test average: SAT: 1230 ACT: 29
- Budget: $18,066 per pupil expenditure (2022–2023)
- Website: river.vansd.org

Columbia River High School (CRHS) is a public high school in Vancouver, Washington, United States. It is part of the Vancouver Public Schools system and opened in 1962. Columbia River has over 1,200 students. Columbia River is a magnet school in the VSD for the International Baccalaureate Program.

== Demographics ==
As of 1 October 2006, 1,317 students attend Columbia River High School. Of all students enrolled, 1,183, or 85% identify themselves as White; 80 or 6% identify themselves as Asian; 56 or 4% identify themselves as Hispanic; 31 or 2% identify themselves as Black; and 15 or 1% identify themselves as American Indian.

Among all grade levels, 16 percent of students are eligible for federally subsidized lunch. One student is enrolled in the English Language Learning program and 132, or 9% of all students receive Special Education. English is the primary language spoken at home for 95% of students, followed by Spanish, Vietnamese, Russian and Ukrainian which are each spoken by 1% of the student body. Of all students, 35% are enrolled on boundary exceptions.

Compared to the Vancouver School District high school populace as a whole, Columbia River students are more white, more likely to speak English at home and less likely to be eligible for subsidized lunches.

== Sports ==
=== Cross country ===
The boys' 1965 (Fall season of 1964) and 1971 (Fall season of 1970) cross country teams won the State Cross Country Championships. Aaron Barron Pintor won the 2025 player 2A GHSL boys runner of the year.

=== Track and field ===
The Columbia River Girls track team won the 3A state championship in 2010. The Columbia River Boys track team won the 2A state championship in 2024

=== Baseball ===
Columbia River won the Washington State 3A championship in 1984 and 1989, and the Washington State 2A championship in 2024.

=== Fastpitch Softball ===
Columbia River won the 1992 and went back-to-back in the 1996 and 1997 Washington State 4A championships.

=== Wrestling ===
Columbia River won the 1969 and 1986 Washington State 3A championship.

=== Volleyball ===
Won the 1991 4A and 2000 3A Washington State championship. The team won four consecutive state championships between 2021 and 2024.

=== Gymnastics ===
Won the 2009 Girls 3A Washington State championships.

=== Soccer ===
The Rapids won the girls 3A soccer state championship in 2010 and 2013, and the 2A soccer state championship in 2017, 2019, and 2022. The Rapids won the boys 2A soccer state championship in 2018 (23-0) and 2023 (24-0).

=== Bowling ===
Columbia River won the girl's 3A bowling state championship 2015.

=== Tennis ===
The Columbia River girls team won the 2019 and 2022 Washington 2A State championship. Lucas Walburn won the 2025 Washington 2A Singles State Championship, and lost in the first round in 2019.

== Capturing Solar Energy ==
Solar panels were installed at Columbia River High School on May 26, 2010. The panels were purchased by a grant through the Clark Public Utilities Green Lights Program. Under peak sun conditions, the panels will produce 2,160 watts of power. Under typical Vancouver conditions, this relates to 2,400 kilowatt hours per year.

== Notable alumni ==
- Bruce Barnum, former head football coach, Portland State University
- Roscoe Divine, 1965 alumnus, elite track and field runner, competed for University of Oregon
- Dan Frantz, 1996 alumnus, placekicker for Chicago Rush (AFL)
- Roger Hambright, former MLB player,New York Yankees
- Denny Heck, 1970 alumnus, Lt. Governor of State of Washington (2021–), congressman from WA 10th District (2013–2020) and founder of TVW
- Ed Herman, Mixed Martial Artist, UFC (2006–2023)
- Yuh-Line Niou, 2001 alumnus, New York assemblymember (2017–2022)
- Joe Phillips, NFL defensive lineman
- Brett Pierce, NFL tight end
- Stan Spencer, former Major League Baseball pitcher (San Diego Padres)
- Howard Wang, 2011 alumnus, American voice actor
