= List of flags of Washington =

This list of flags of Washington includes flags associated with the U.S. state of Washington, including the state flag, flags of units of the Washington Army National Guard, municipal flags, historical flags, and a proposed state flag.

== State flag ==
Flag	Date	Use	Description
	1923 (Standardized in 1967)	State and civil flag	A state seal sized at 1/3 the length of the flag centered on a field of dark green. 2:3, 3:5, or 5:8 aspect ratio.

== Military flags ==
Flag	Date	Use	Description
		Washington Army National Guard Headquarters	A blue field, defaced with the insignia of the Washington Army National Guard.
		Washington ARNG 96th Troop Command	A tricolor of blue-maize-blue, defaced with the insignia of the Washington Army National Guard.

== City flags ==
Flag	Date	Use	Description
	2021	Flag of Spokane	
		Flag of Tacoma	A navy blue field with the seal charged in the middle.
	2025	Flag of Vancouver	Green over blue, bisected by a white chevron connected to a white stripe. Above the white chevron is a stylized building in white. 2:3 aspect ratio.

== Historic flags ==
Flag	Date	Use	Description
		Flag of the Hudson's Bay Company	Flag used in Oregon Country by the HBC.
	1893	Flag of the Washington Suffragettes	A blue field charged with an orange five-pointed star. The color orange was chosen to honor the efforts of Orange Jacobs, a prominent suffragist.
	1905–1917	Flag of Washington (erroneous)	Similar to the current flag, but with a red background instead of a green one. Produced on cigarette silks by the Liggett & Myers Tobacco Company as part of a series.

== Proposed flags ==
Flag	Date	Use	Description
	1976	Proposed flag	
