= Vancouver Wine and Jazz Festival =

Annual event in Washington, US

Coordinates: 45°37′35″N 122°40′30″W

The Vancouver Wine and Jazz Festival is an annual music and fine wine festival that takes place every year at Esther Short Park in Vancouver, Washington. It has been held every year since 1998 (except 2020 & 2021, due to the COVID-19 pandemic). The festival brought in approximately 13,500 people in 2012, and between 12,000 and 15,000 in 2011. The Wine and Jazz festival is part of the concert series of Bravo! Vancouver. The 2012 festival featured artists such as Diane Schuur, Arturo Sandoval, Al Jarreau, Coco Montoya, The Christopher Brothers, and John Hammond, Jr.

Over the years, the festival has welcomed attendees from 25 states, Europe, China, Japan and Canada, with more than 150,000 people have attended since its inception.

The Vancouver Wine & Jazz Festival was honored with the '2023 Event of the Year' for Southwest Washington by the Washington Festivals and Events Association and was awarded a 2024 grant from the ArtsFund, part of the Paul G. Allen Family Foundation.

The festival was founded in 1998 by professional classical and jazz clarinetist, conductor, composer, and producer, Dr. Michael Kissinger.
