= Vancouver Public Schools =

School district in Washington, USA

Coordinates: 45°38′34″N 122°37′36″W

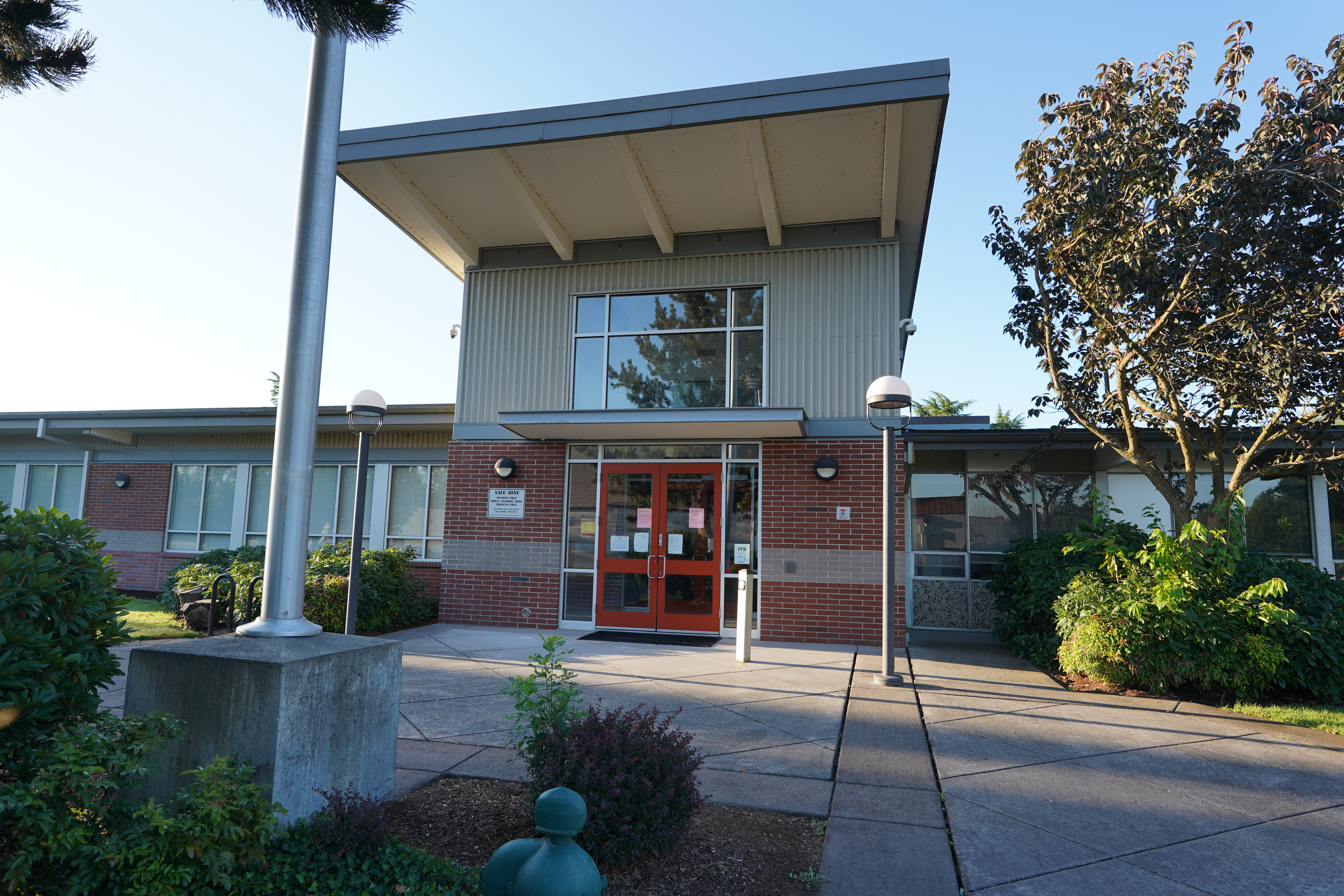
- Administrative Services building

Location
- 2901 Falk Road, Vancouver, WA, 98661 United States

District information
- Motto: "Inspiring Learning. Growing Community. Each Student, Every Day."
- Grades: PK - 12

Students and staff
- Students: 22,192 (2011)
- Teachers: 1111
- Staff: 3200

Other information
- Website: www.vansd.org

Vancouver Public Schools is a school district in Vancouver, Washington covering 58 square miles (150.2 km^{2}) in Clark County.

== Boundary ==
The district includes a section of Vancouver. It also includes Felida, Lake Shore, Minnehaha, most of Hazel Dell and Salmon Creek, and portions of Barberton and Mount Vista.

== Schools ==
The district has 36 schools:

- 21 elementary schools (PK-Grade 5)
- 6 middle schools (Grades 6-8)
- 5 high schools (Grades 9 to 12)

Vancouver High School stood for many years at the intersection of Columbia and West Fourth Plain Boulevard, but was closed in the mid-1950s, with students divided between two new schools: Fort Vancouver High School and Hudson's Bay High School.

=== High Schools (9-12) ===
| Name | Established | Enrollment | Mascot | WIAA Classification |
|---|---|---|---|---|
| Columbia River | 1962 | 1307 | Rapids | 2A |
| Fort Vancouver | 1888 | 1504 | Trappers | 1A |
| Hudson's Bay | 1956 | 1522 | Eagles | 2A |
| Skyview | 1997 | 1975 | Storm | 4A |

=== Middle Schools (6-8) ===
| Name | Location | Mascot | High School Feeder |
|---|---|---|---|
| Alki | Salmon Creek | Wolves | Skyview High School |
| Discovery | Vancouver | Wildcats | Hudson's Bay High School |
| Gaiser | Salmon Creek | Grizzlies | Fort Vancouver, Skyview |
| Jason Lee | Hazel Dell | Panthers | Columbia River, Hudson's Bay |
| Thomas Jefferson | Felida | Explorers | Columbia River, Skyview |
| McLoughlin | Vancouver | Pioneers | Fort Vancouver High School |

=== Elementary Schools (K-5) ===
| Name | Location | Mascot | Middle School Feeder |
|---|---|---|---|
| Anderson | Salmon Creek | Pioneers | Gaiser |
| Chinook | Salmon Creek | Wolf Pups | Alki |
| Eisenhower | Hazel Dell | Eagles | Jason Lee |
| Felida | Felida | Falcons | Thomas Jefferson |
| Franklin | Vancouver | Patriots | Discovery |
| Fruit Valley | Vancouver | Panthers | Discovery |
| Harney | Vancouver | Hornets | Discovery, McLoughlin |
| Hazel Dell | Hazel Dell | Panthers | Gaiser, Jason Lee |
| Hough | Vancouver | Hawks | Discovery |
| King | Vancouver | King Cubs | McLoughlin |
| Lake Shore | Lake Shore | Seagulls | Thomas Jefferson |
| Lincoln | Vancouver | Loggers | Discovery |
| Marshall | Vancouver | Generals | McLoughlin |
| Minnehaha | Minnehaha | Mammoth | Jason Lee |
| Ogden | Vancouver | Cougars | McLoughlin |
| Roosevelt | Vancouver | Ambassadors | McLoughlin |
| Ruth Bader Ginsburg | Hazel Dell | Dragons | N/A |
| Sacajawea | Salmon Creek | Skyhawks | Thomas Jefferson |
| Salmon Creek | Salmon Creek | Huskies | Alki |
| Truman | Minnehaha | Trailblazers | Gaiser |
| Walnut Grove | Minnehaha | Eagles | Gaiser |
| Washington | Rose Village | Huskies | Discovery |

=== Alternative Schools ===
| Name | Grades | Opened | Students | Mascot | WIAA Classification |
|---|---|---|---|---|---|
| Vancouver School of Arts and Academics | 6-12 | 1996 | 556 | N/A | N/A |
| Vancouver Flex Academy | 9-12 | 1970 | 370 | Compass Rose | N/A |
| Vancouver iTech Preparatory | 6-12 | 2012 | 220 | Raven | 3A |
