= Hudson's Bay High School =

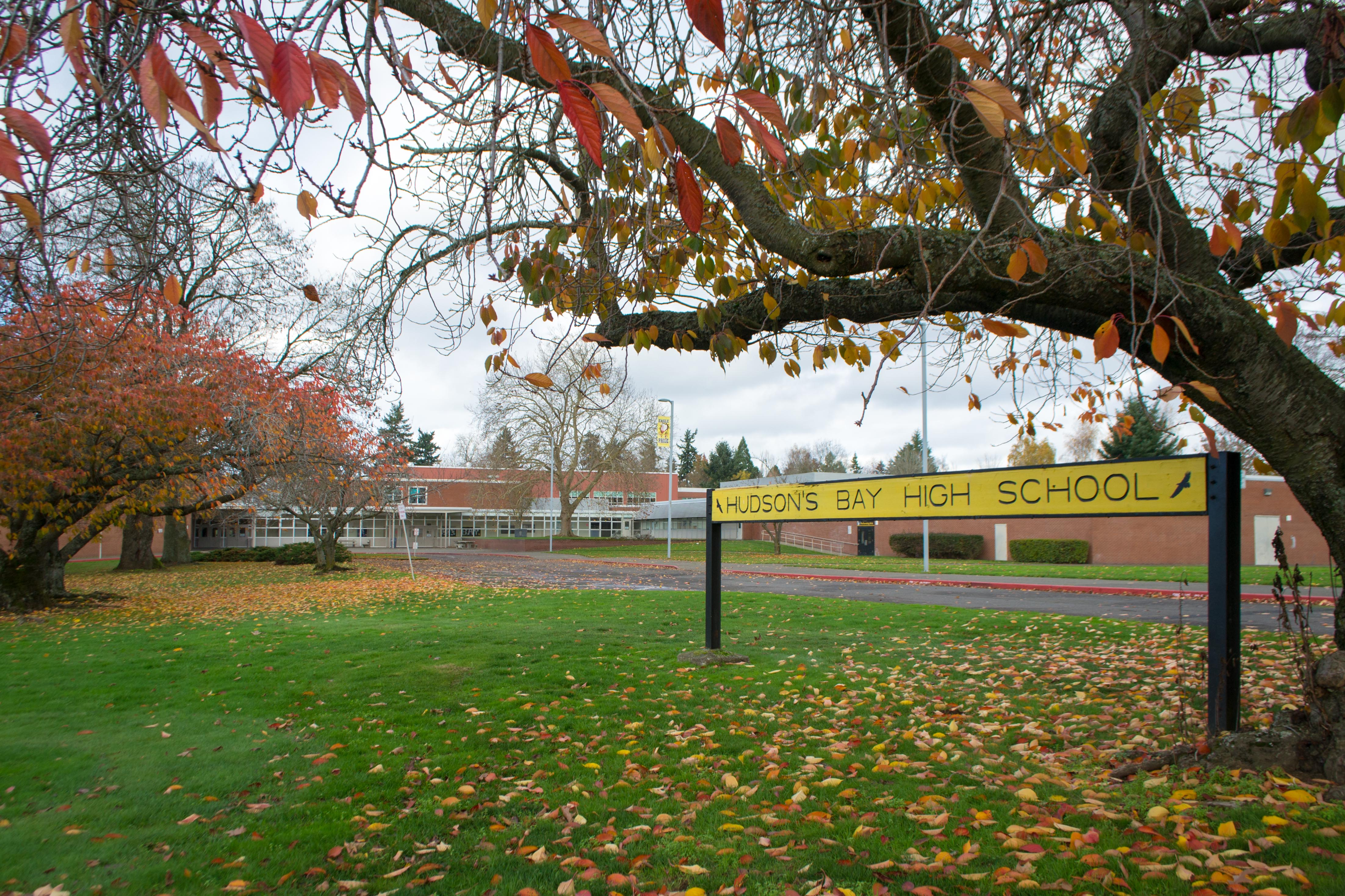

Location
- 1206 East Reserve Street; Vancouver, Washington 98663; United States; 45.63100°N 122.65326°W

Information
- Type: Public (magnet) secondary
- School district: Vancouver Public Schools
- NCES School ID: 530927001569
- Principal: Amber Beardmore
- Staff: 57.08 (FTE)
- Grades: 9–12
- Enrollment: 1,169 (2023-2024)
- Student to teacher ratio: 20.48
- Colors: Black and gold
- Mascot: Eagle
- Newspaper: The Eagle Eye
- Website: bay.vansd.org

Hudson's Bay High School is a public high school in the Central Park area of Vancouver, Washington, and is part of Vancouver Public Schools. It was founded in 1955 and was named after the Hudson's Bay Company (HBC), as Fort Vancouver had been chosen, in 1821, as the HBC base of operations on the Pacific Slope. Hudson's Bay is known for having two strong magnet programs, as well as a children's day care and district-wide mothers' transportation program. It is located across from Clark College, where many Bay students participate in the Running Start program.

== Magnet Programs ==
Hudson's Bay offers two magnet programs—Careers in Education, and Habitat and Civil Engineering.

== Careers in Education ==
The Careers in Education magnet program prepares students for future careers in the fields of child development, family psychology, teaching, and instructional theory. Students take courses focused on these topics, and apply their learning through direct interaction with infants and children.

== Habitat and Civil Engineering ==
The Habitat and Civil Engineering magnet is a four-year program that offers in-depth education to those students planning careers in urban horticulture, landscaping, ecology, Urban planning, Civil engineering, and Architecture. Students apply their learning working in Hudson Bay's horticulture center, nursery, and science park, and through internships and work experience.

== Sports ==
Hudson's Bay is a member of the Washington Interscholastic Activities Association (WIAA) and participates in the Greater St. Helens 2A league.

=== State championships ===
- Boys Basketball: 1964
- Boys Tennis: 2003
- Boys Track: 1961
- Girls Tennis: 1971

== Notable alumni ==
- Chantelle Anderson— former WNBA player.
- Kerry Brady— former NFL player
- Charissa Chamorro—actress
- Tina Ellertson— former defender on the United States Women's National Soccer Team
- Chris Gissell, former MLB player (Colorado Rockies)
- Robert F. Jeaudoin, professional wrestler under the ring name Bobby Jaggers
- C. S. Lee — actor
- David Wood—former NBA player
- Nadine Woodward, journalist and Mayor of Spokane, Washington

== Shadbreon Gatson Incident ==
In December 2024, during winter break, Shadbreon Gatson, a teacher at Hudson's Bay High School, was arrested on charges of inappropriate sexual contact with a minor. Gatson was let go days later due to the statute of limitations having expired. Allegedly, Gatson had sexual contact with one of his students in 2013. This is backed up by Gatson having a history of being written up for breaking boundaries with students.

In 2013, Gatson was involved in an incident where he had asked a custodian to open a band closet so he could retrieve some drums. The custodian then left to clean but eventually returned to the band closet. Upon returning he reported noticing the lights off and hearing "noises from two different people". Gatson then came out with his shoes off and his shirt untucked. Gatson's reason for not wearing his shoes was that he couldn't play the drums with them on. After interviewing both Gatson and the girl, it was determined that nothing of a sexual nature had happened.

“There were some definite blurred boundaries and very poor judgement by Shad,” quote by then Principal Bill Oman.

Gatson would be written up for this incident. The girl involved in the incident would later come forward, revealing Gatson had indeed molested her, resulting in his 2024 arrest. In 2017, Gatson was again written up for violating Student-Teacher boundaries after allowing two girls who weren't in his class into his classroom.

Your behavior is particularly troubling, given you were previously directed to maintain appropriate employee-student boundaries by Valerie Seely in November 2014. Further, you received a letter of admonishment in regards to exercising poor judgement and boundaries with a female student on June 12, 2013.

letter sent to Gatson by an associate principal.

Following Gatson's 2024 arrest and release, students at Bay would walk out of classes during early third period to demand changes in school policy. The at the time principal, Valerie Seeley (who was associate principal during both of Gatson's write ups), was fired for missing important warning signs of Gatson's behavior. Seeley was replaced by current Principal Amber Beardmore.
