= Skyview High School (Vancouver, Washington) =

- The main entrance to Skyview High School

Location
- 1300 NW 139th St; Vancouver, Washington 98685; United States; 45°43′19″N 122°41′1″W

Information
- Type: Public
- Established: 1997
- School district: Vancouver Public Schools
- Superintendent: Steven Webb
- Principal: Andy Meyer
- Teaching staff: 78.28 (FTE)
- Grades: 9-12
- Enrollment: 1,780 (2023-2024)
- Student to teacher ratio: 22.74
- Colors: Navy, silver and white
- Athletics conference: Greater St. Helens League
- Nickname: Storm
- Newspaper: The Horizon
- Website: skyview.vansd.org

Skyview High School is a high school in the Salmon Creek area of northern Vancouver, Washington, United States. Opened in 1997, it is the second newest of seven high schools in the Vancouver School District. The building design incorporates an open classroom floor plan with the use of many windows and features a 10,000-square-foot (930 m^{2}) common area at the center of the school. The building is 292,000-square-foot (27,100 m^{2}), including a 1,150-seat auditorium, which has hosted speakers such as Howard Dean and is the current performance venue for the Vancouver Symphony. Skyview is home to the SMT (Science Math and Technology Magnet) for the Vancouver schools.

== Athletics ==
=== Football ===
Skyview's football team has competed in the 4A state playoffs every year since 2005 including three semifinal appearances (2009, 2011, and 2016) and one state championship game appearance (2011).

=== Cheerleading ===
Skyview's varsity cheer team won state in 2009 bringing home Skyview's second state championship for the school.

=== Tennis ===
Skyview's girls tennis team won the 2013 4A state championship. Skyview's no-cut policy for the tennis team was recognized by the United States Tennis Association.

=== Basketball ===
The girls varsity basketball team won the 4A state championship in 2012.

In 2024 the boys basketball varsity team got 6th in state.

=== Baseball ===
Skyview's baseball team won the 2013 4A state championship. They made 3 consecutive state final four appearances from 2017-2019 and had a 17-0 record in the 2021 season.

=== Boys Soccer ===
Skyview's boys soccer team won the 2012 4A state championship.

== Arts ==
=== Marching Band ===
The Skyview Marching Band competes in the Northwest Association for Performing Arts (NWAPA). The band competed in Open Class from 2000-2015. The band was selected to perform at the 2008 Summer Olympics opening ceremony, hosted in China.

=== Winter Percussion ===
Skyview Percussion competes in the Northwest Association for Performing Arts (NWAPA), and Winter Guard International (WGI).

=== Dance Team ===
The Reign dance team were state champs in 2005, 2009, and 2011.

== Student activities ==
=== Robotics ===
Skyview High School is home to two FIRST Robotics Competition teams: the 2811 StormBots, established in 2009, and the 9567 StormBreakers, established in 2024.

== Demographics ==
In October 2012, the school's population was 52.9% male and 47.1% female. In the same report from the Office of the Superintendent of Public Instruction, the racial breakdown was 77.0% white, 9.7% Hispanic, 5.6% Asian or Pacific Islander, 3.7% mixed race, 3.1% black and 0.9% Native American.

== September 2021 protest ==
On September 3, 2021, an anti-mask protest occurred outside the school, resulting in an hour-long lockdown for Skyview and the two schools adjacent to it after an attempt was made to escort a student with a medical exemption into the school.

== Notable alumni ==
- Ana Cabrera, journalist
- Thomas Fletcher (American football), NFL long snapper
- Ian Hamilton, MLB relief pitcher
- Alex Schumacher, NBA G League player
- Kara Winger, American record holder in javelin
