= Flag of Vancouver, Washington =

City Flag Vancouver, Washington

The flag of the American city of Vancouver, Washington, was changed in 2025. The current was designed by Nathan Hunter and Brooke Nugent. The previous design had been used since 1993.
