= Vancouver School of Arts and Academics =

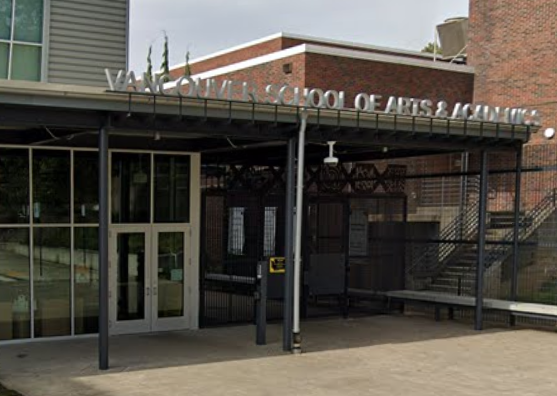

Location
- 3101 Main Street; Vancouver, Washington 98663; United States; 45.643939°N 122.668211°W

Information
- Type: Public magnet school
- Motto: "Ars Longa, Vita Brevis" ("Art Is Long, Life Is Short")
- Established: 1996; 30 years ago
- School district: Vancouver Public Schools
- NCES School ID: 530927002508
- Principal: Dr. Joseph Accuardi-Gilliam
- Teaching staff: 39.90 (on an FTE basis)
- Grades: 6–12
- Enrollment: 787 (Semester 2 2025)
- Student to teacher ratio: 19.72
- Colors: Black and white
- Newspaper: Vita Brevis
- Website: arts.vansd.org

The Vancouver School of Arts and Academics (VSAA) is a public arts magnet school for grades 6 to 12 in Vancouver, Washington, United States. It is part of the Vancouver Public Schools and in addition to traditional academic studies, the school's curriculum has an in-depth elective study of the performing, literary, musicall, theatrical and visual arts, as well as film studies (called "moving image arts" at the school).

== History ==
The VSAA was established in 1996. From 1929 to 1995, the building originally housed Shumway Junior High School. Leslie Durst has been a substantial donor to VSAA since the school's beginning, supporting the arts and maintenance of the school building itself. The Royal Durst Theatre was funded by Durst and named after her father. Recently, she funded the replacement of the seats in the Royal Durst theatre. Leslie Durst continues to be a part in helping art students succeed by giving out the Leslie B. Durst scholarship to VSAA students that will continue to pursue the arts in college.

== Motto ==
The Latin motto "Ars Longa, Vita Brevis", originally from Greek, translates to "Art Is long, Life Is Short". Although, staff at the school frequently translate it to the somewhat less metaphorical and marginally erroneous "Life Is Short, Art Is Forever". The school has a monthly newspaper called Vita Brevis, and a yearbook called Ars Longa, both named after the quote.
