= Vancouver, Washington =

City in Washington, United States

- City
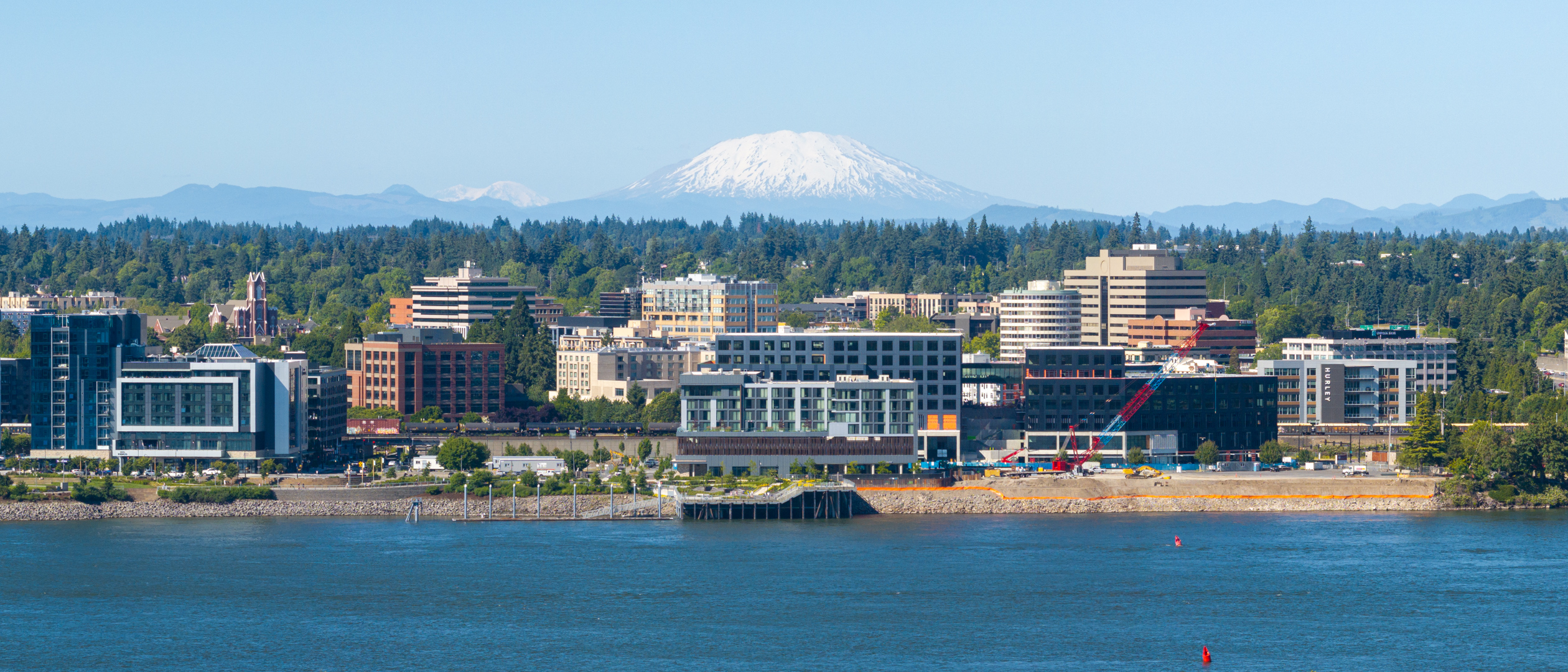
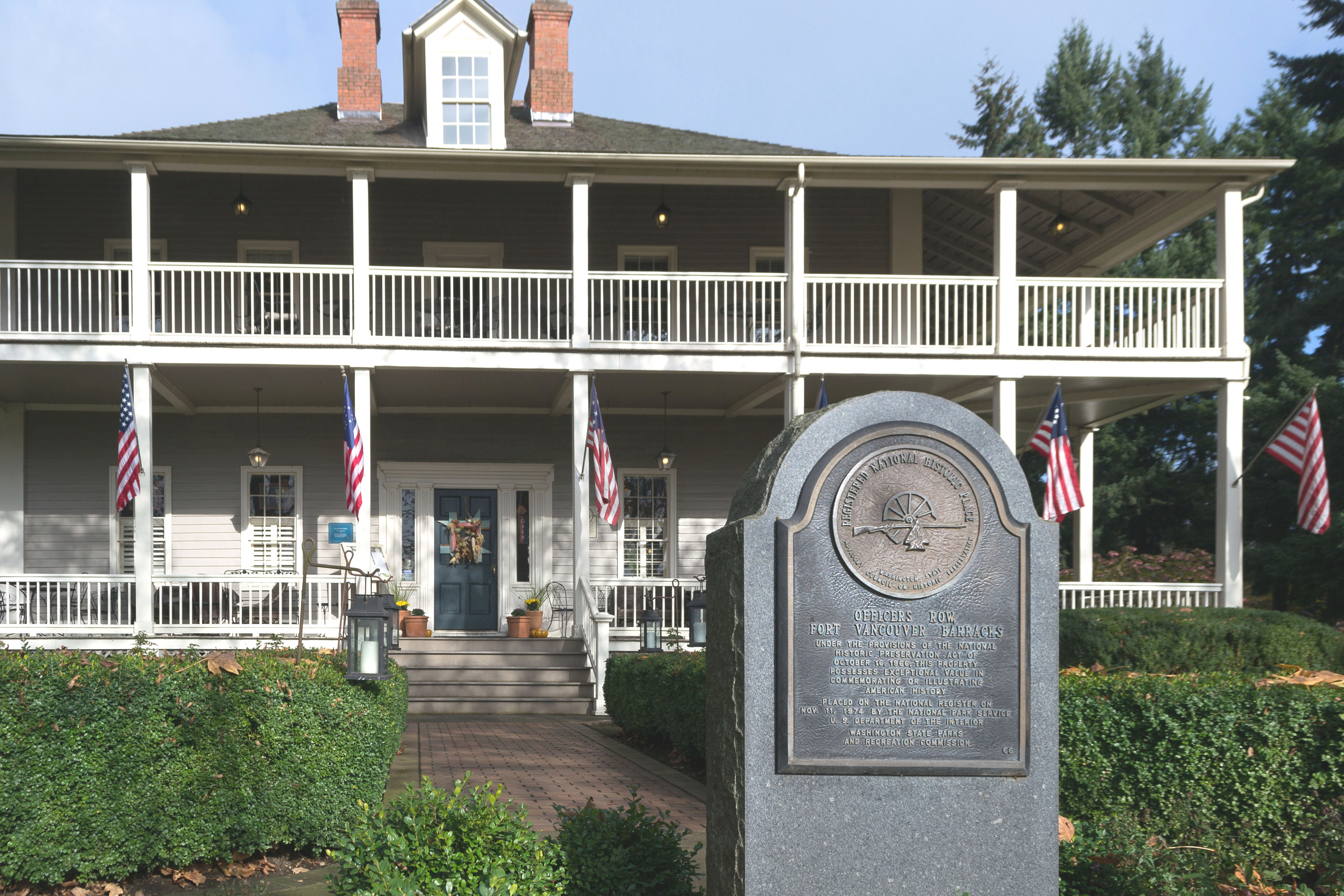
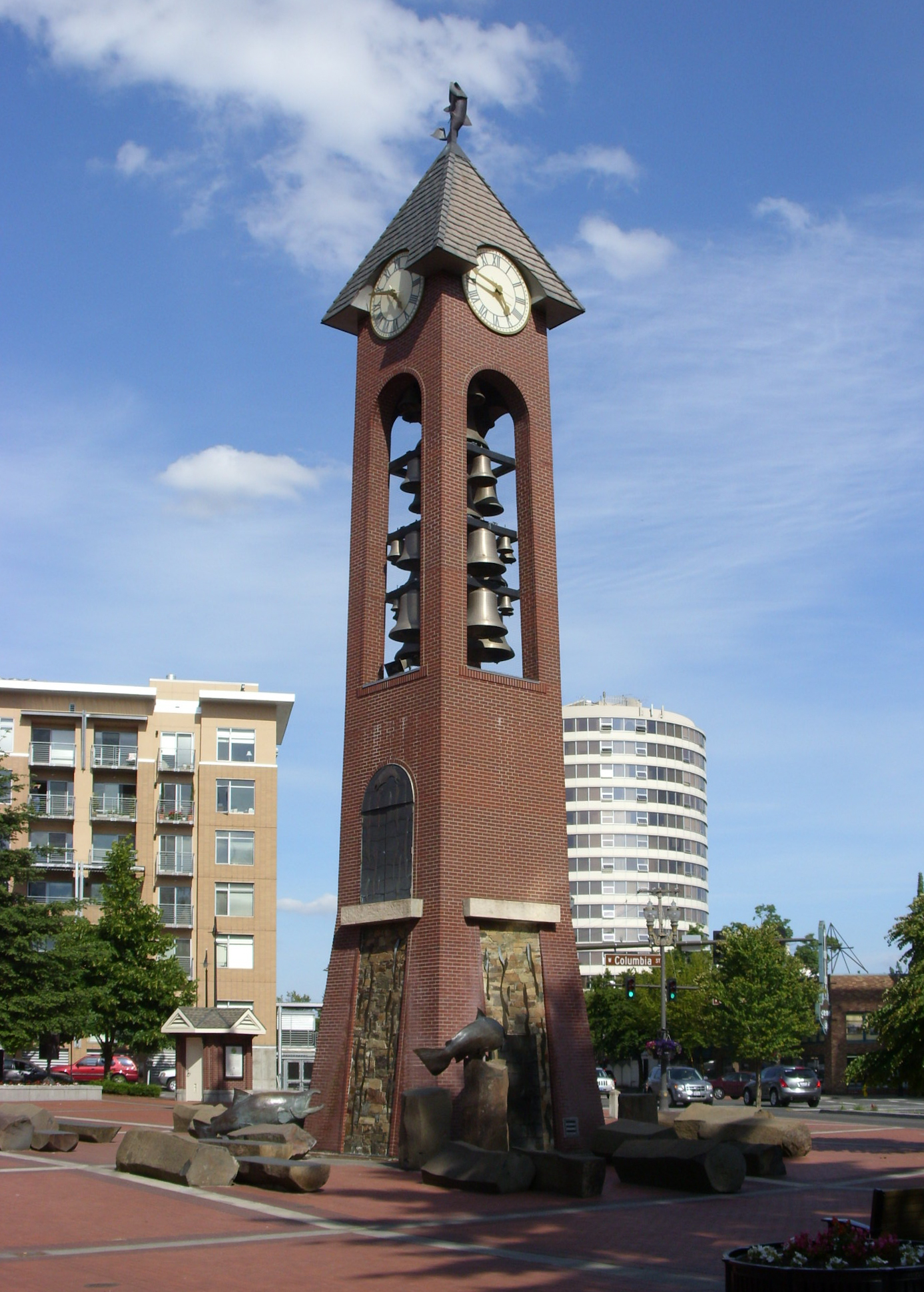
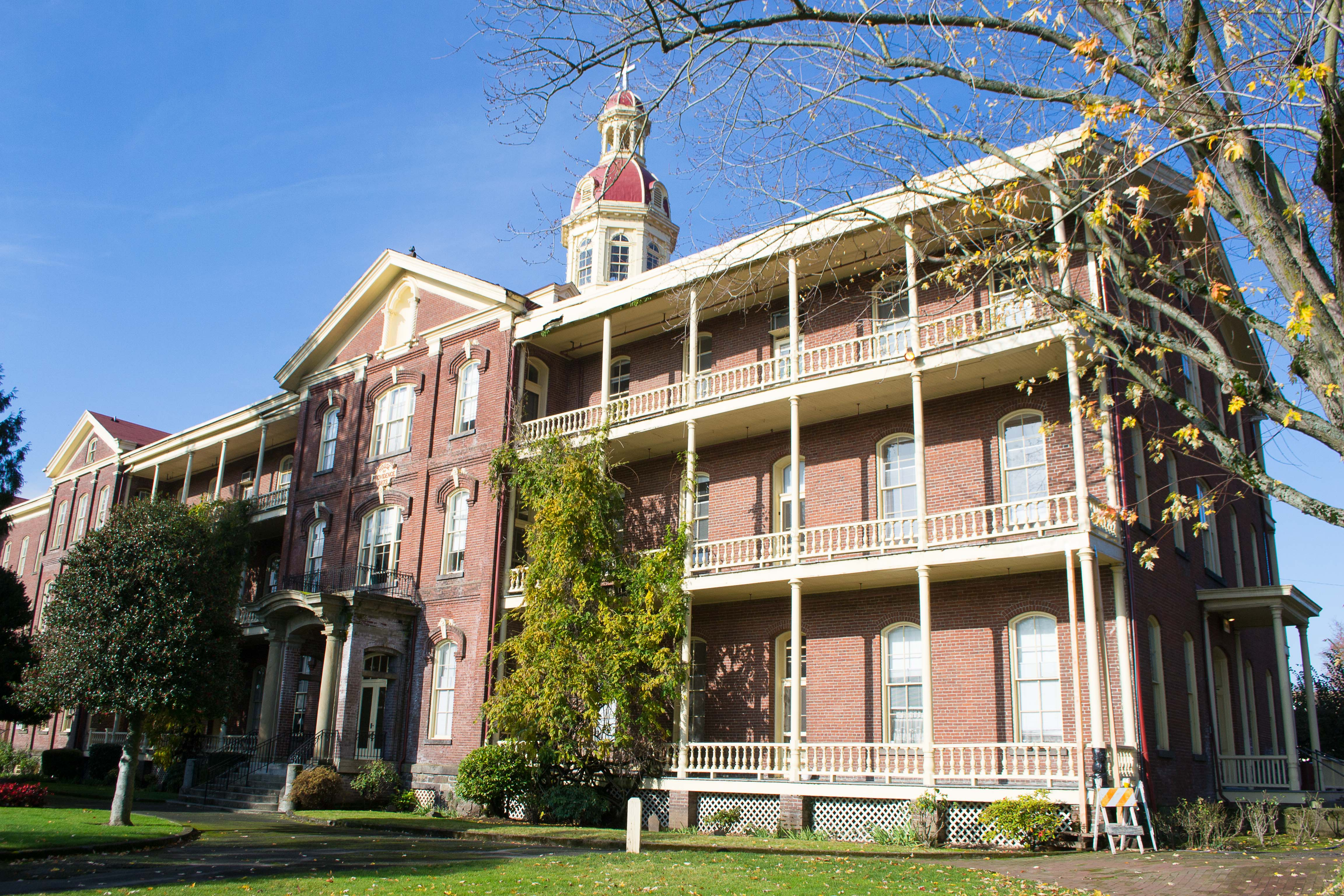
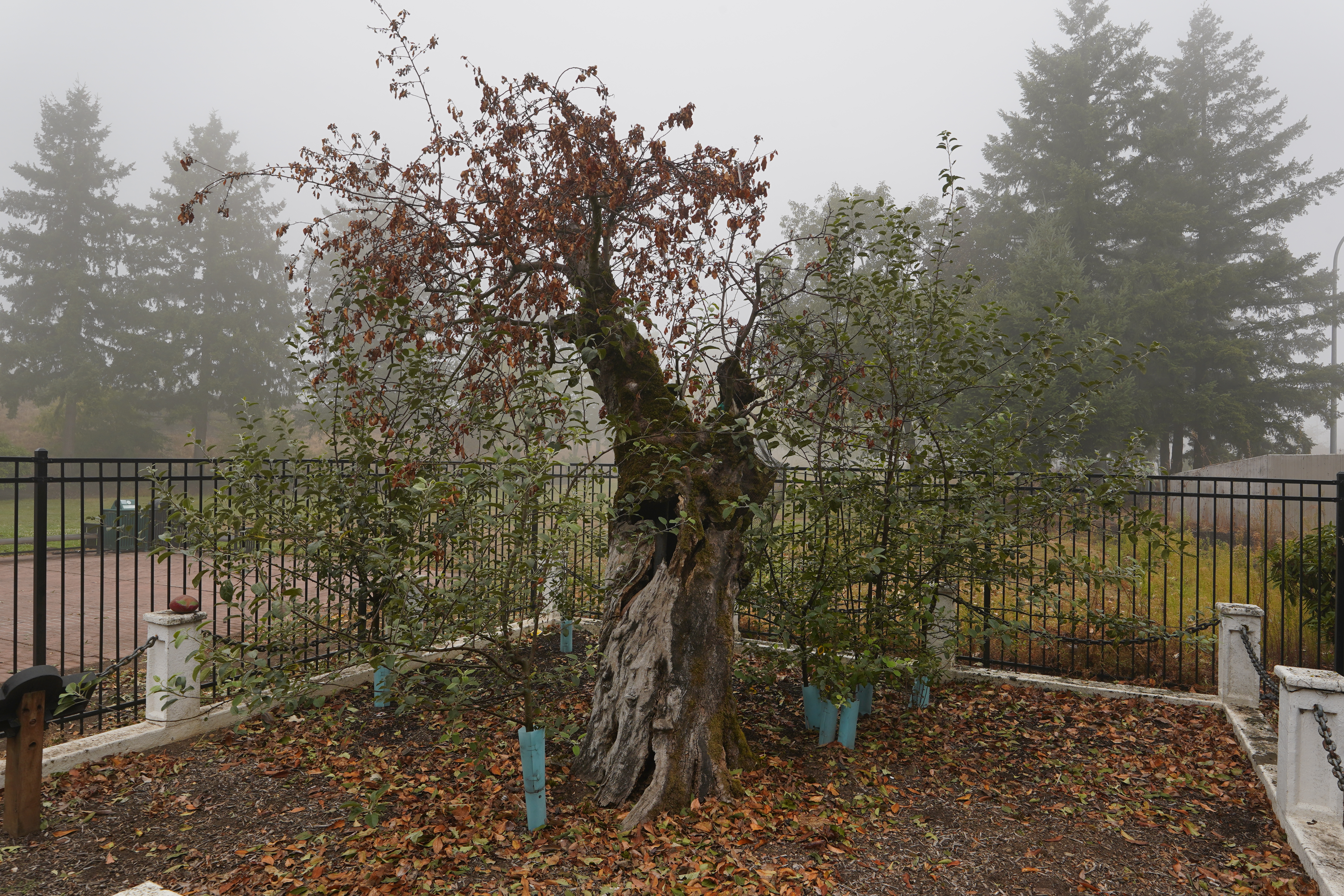
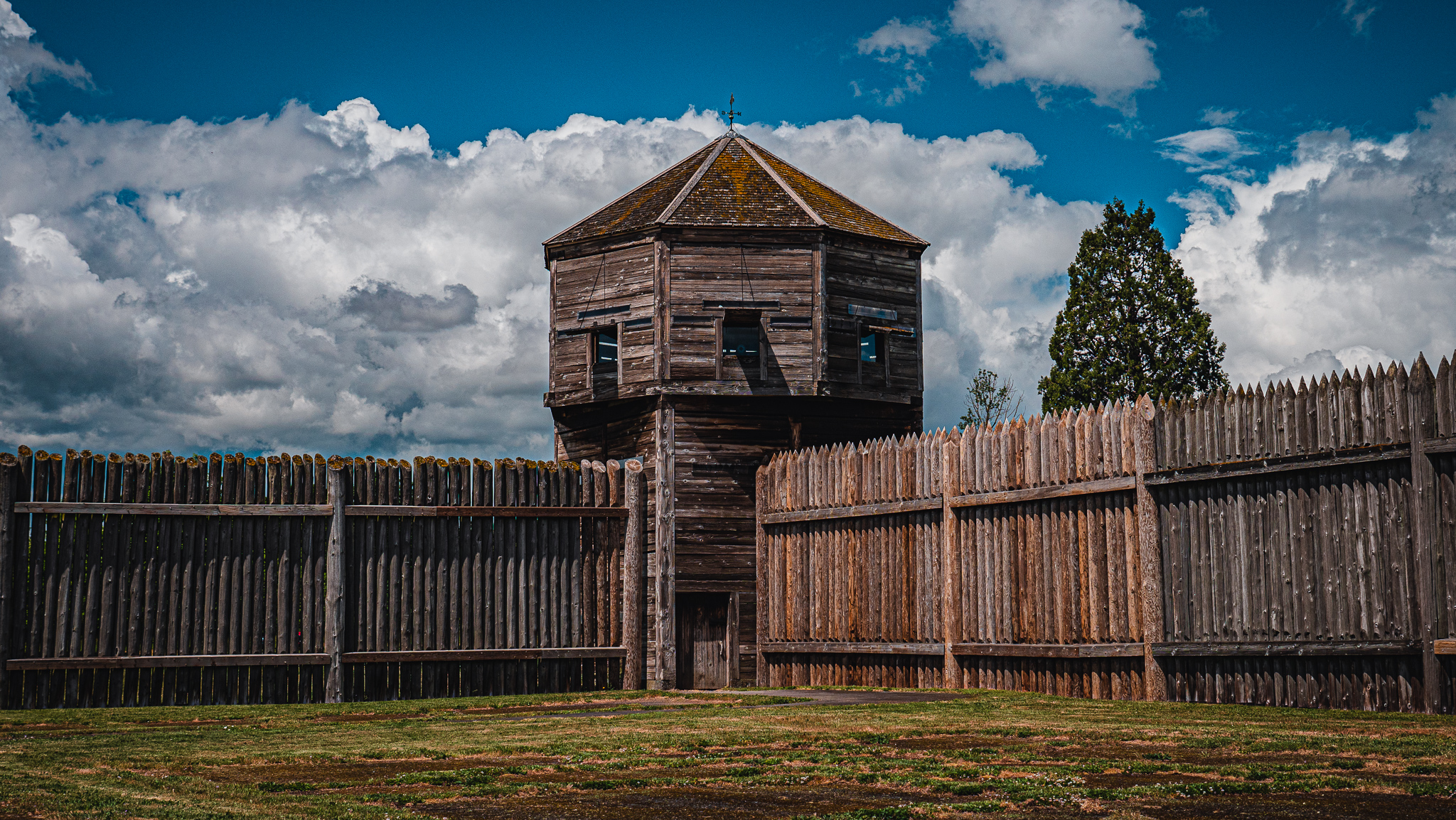
- Skyline of Vancouver with Mount St. Helens in the background Vancouver Barracks Esther Short Park House of Providence Old Apple Tree Park Fort Vancouver

- Flag Logo
- Motto: A colorful past, a bright future
- Interactive map of Vancouver, Washington
- Location within Washington (state) Location within the United States
- Coordinates: 45°37′52″N 122°40′18″W
- Country: United States
- State: Washington
- County: Clark
- Founded: 1825
- Incorporated: January 23, 1857
- Named for: George Vancouver

Government
  - Type: Council–manager
  - Body: Vancouver City Council
  - Mayor: Anne McEnerny-Ogle

Area
  - City: 52.45 sq mi (135.84 km^{2})
  - Land: 48.75 sq mi (126.25 km^{2})
  - Water: 3.70 sq mi (9.59 km^{2})
- Elevation: 180 ft (55 m)

Population (2020)
  - City: 190,915
  - Estimate (2026): 200,000
  - Rank: U.S.: 130th WA: 4th
  - Density: 3,784.3/sq mi (1,461.14/km^{2})
  - Urban: 2,104,238 (US: 23rd)
  - Metro: 2,509,489 (US: 25th)
- Demonym: Vancouverite
- Time zone: UTC−8 (Pacific (PST))
  - Summer (DST): UTC−7 (PDT)
- ZIP Codes: 98660–98666, 98668, 98682–98687
- Area codes: 360, 564
- FIPS code: 53-74060
- GNIS feature ID: 2412146
- Website: cityofvancouver.us

Vancouver (/væn.ˈkuː.vər/ van-KOO-vər) is a city in Clark County, Washington, United States, located on the north bank of the Columbia River. It had a population of 190,915 at the 2020 census, making it the fourth-most populous city in Washington. Founded in 1825 and incorporated in 1857, the city was originally established around Fort Vancouver, a fur trading outpost, and is situated directly north of Portland, Oregon, along the Washington–Oregon state line. Vancouver serves as the county seat of Clark County and is part of the Portland metropolitan area.

== Etymology ==
Vancouver shares its name with the larger city of Vancouver, British Columbia, Canada, approximately 300 miles (480 km) to the north. Both cities were named after British sea captain George Vancouver (as is Vancouver Island), but the U.S. city is older. Vancouver, British Columbia, was incorporated 29 years after the incorporation of Vancouver, Washington, and more than 60 years after the name "Vancouver" was first used in reference to the historic Fort Vancouver trading post on the Columbia River. City officials have periodically suggested changing the U.S. city's name to "Fort Vancouver" to reduce confusion with its larger and better-known northern neighbor. Many Pacific Northwest residents distinguish between the two cities by referring to the Canadian city as "Vancouver, B.C." and the United States city as "Vancouver, Washington", or "Vancouver, USA". Local nicknames formerly included "Vantucky" (though this is used as a derogatory term) and "The 'Couv(e)".

== History ==
=== Early settlements and exploration ===
The Vancouver area was inhabited by several Native American tribes, most recently the Chinook and Klickitat nations, with permanent settlements of timber longhouses. The Chinookan and Klickitat names for the area were reportedly Skit-so-to-ho and Ala-si-kas, respectively, meaning 'land of the mud-turtles'. First known European contact was made by William Robert Broughton in 1792, with approximately half of the indigenous population killed by smallpox before the Lewis and Clark Expedition arrived in the area in 1806. Within another fifty years, other diseases such as measles, malaria and influenza had reduced the Chinookan population from an estimated 80,000 "to a few dozen refugees, landless, slaveless and swindled out of a treaty".

=== 19th-century beginnings ===
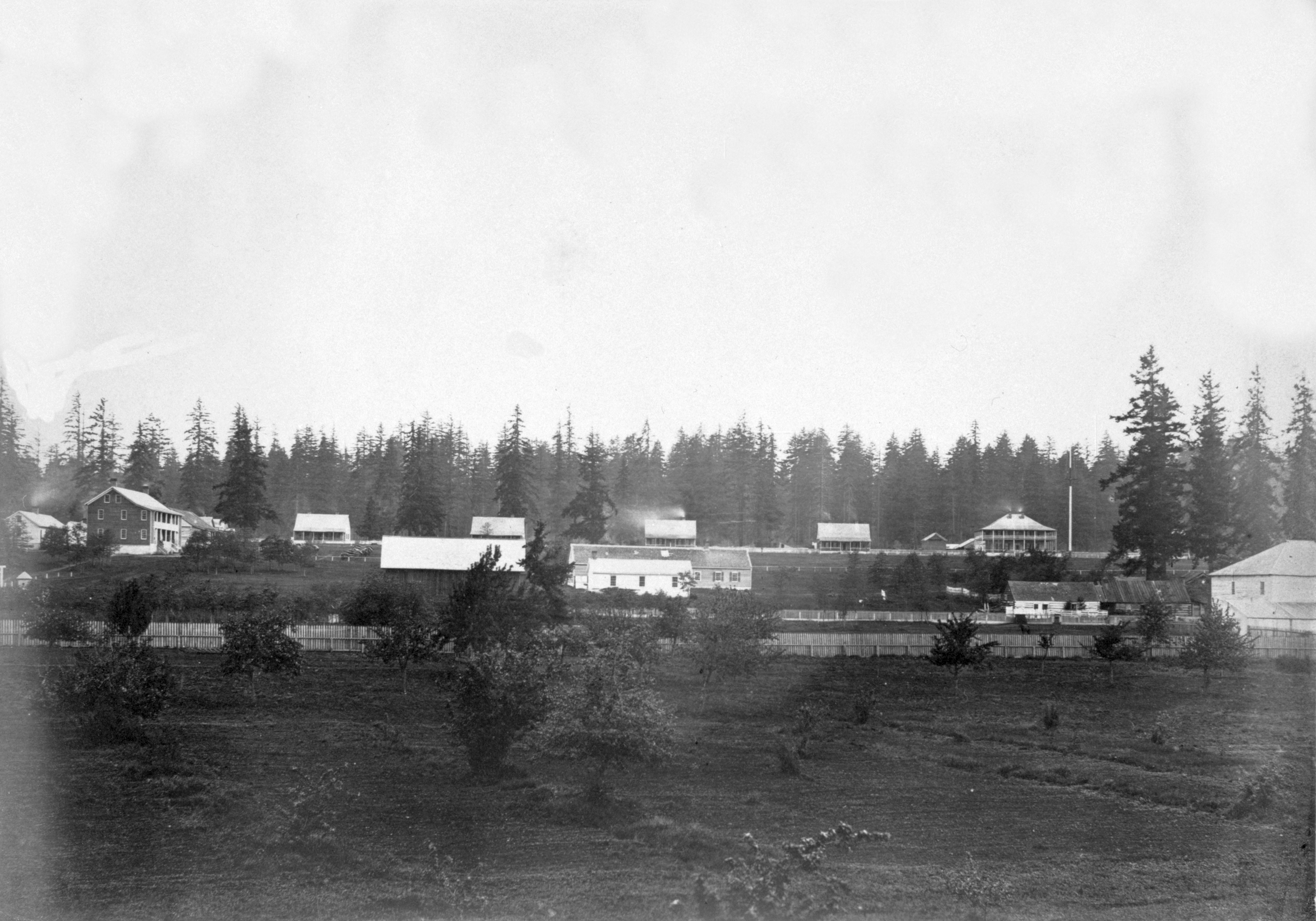
Fort Vancouver in 1859

Meriwether Lewis wrote that the Vancouver area was "the only desired situation for settlement west of the Rocky Mountains". The first permanent European settlement did not occur until 1824, when Fort Vancouver was established as a fur trading post of the Hudson's Bay Company. From that time on, the area was settled by both the US and Britain under a "joint occupation" agreement. Joint occupation led to the Oregon boundary dispute and ended on June 15, 1846, with the signing of the Oregon Treaty, which gave the United States full control of the area. Before 1845, American Henry Williamson laid out a large claim west of the Hudson's Bay Company (including part of the present-day Port of Vancouver), called "Vancouver City" and properly registered his claim at the U.S. courthouse in Oregon City, before leaving for California. In 1848, Williamson had it surveyed and platted by Peter Crawford. In 1850, Amos Short traced over the claim of Williamson and named the town "Columbia City". It changed to "Vancouver" in 1855. The City of Vancouver was incorporated on January 23, 1857.

Based on an act of the 1859–60 legislature, Vancouver was briefly the capital of Washington Territory, before capital status was returned to Olympia by a 2–1 ruling of the territorial supreme court, in accordance with Isaac Stevens' preference and concern that proximity to the border with Oregon might give some of the state's influence away to Oregon.

=== 20th century ===
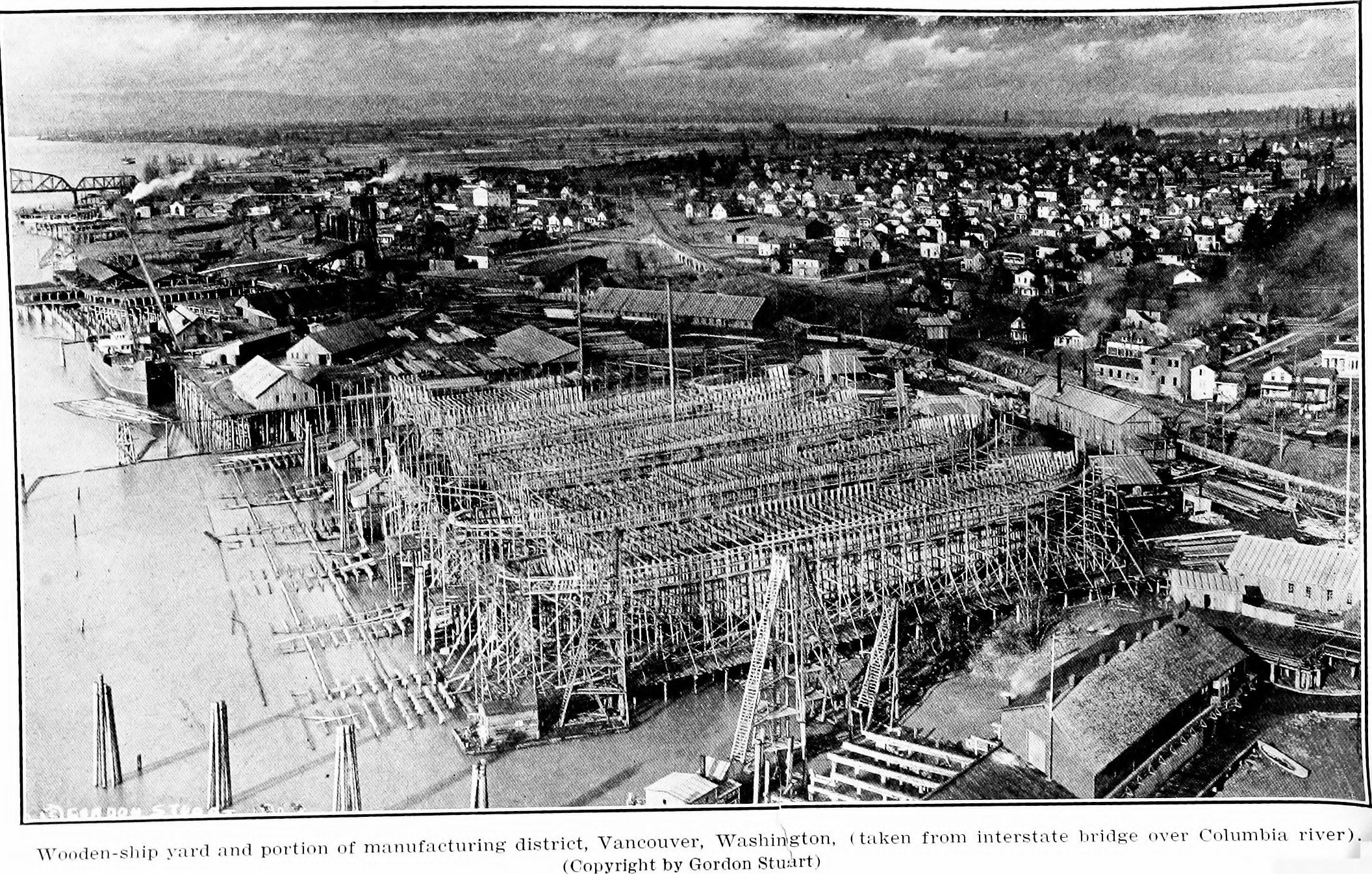
Wooden shipyard in Vancouver, 1918

The neighborhood of Sifton was the terminus of an early electric trolley operated by the Northcoast Power Company that also served nearby Orchards from 1910 until 1926. The trolleys made ten stops and ran once per hour, charging 15 cents each way. A mural in the heart of Orchards depicts the trolley and the rural character of the area at the time it was operating. The community was named after Doctor Sifton, a promoter of the trolley service.

According to the archives of the Vancouver Columbian newspaper, the Orchards-Sifton route ran along Vancouver's Main Street to 26th Street (renamed Fourth Plain Blvd.), then from 26th to K Street and thence north to 33rd Street. From there, it ran on 33rd over Burnt Bridge Creek and past the city limits. At that point the trolley became more like a regular train as it followed a cut through the wilderness. Few houses were seen between Vancouver and Orchards. The public's growing preference for motor cars in the 1920s heralded the end of the trolley.

Separated from Oregon until 1917, when the new Interstate Bridge began to replace ferries, Vancouver had three shipyards just downstream which produced ships for World War I before World War II brought an enormous economic boom. An Alcoa aluminum plant opened on September 2, 1940, using inexpensive power from the nearby New Deal hydropower turbines at Bonneville Dam. After the bombing of Pearl Harbor, Henry Kaiser opened a shipyard next to the U.S. Army base, which by 1944 employed as many as 36,000 people in a twenty-four hours a day, seven days a week production of Liberty ships, landing ship tanks, and escort carriers. This influx of shipyard workers boosted the population from 18,000 to over 80,000 in just a few months, leading to the creation of the Vancouver Housing Authority and six new residential developments: Fruit Valley, Fourth Plain Village, Bagley Downs, Ogden Meadows, Burton Homes and McLoughlin Heights. Each of these was later incorporated into the city, and are well-known neighborhoods, while the neighboring "shipyard city" of Vanport, Oregon, would be destroyed by the Memorial Day flood of 1948.

Vancouver has experienced conflicts with other Clark County communities because of rapid growth in the area. The city's first annexation more than doubled its size in 1909, with the largest annexation of 1997 adding 11,258 acres (45.56 km^{2}) and 58,171 residents. As a result of urban growth and the 1997 annexation, Vancouver is often thought of as split between two areas, East and West Vancouver, divided by NE Andresen Road. West Vancouver is home to downtown Vancouver and most of the more historical parts of the city, as well as recent high-density mixed-use development. East Vancouver includes the communities of Cascade Park East and West, which had populations of 6,996 and 6,956 in 1990, before annexation.

=== 21st century ===
More than one-third of the Vancouver urban area's population lives in unincorporated urban areas north of the city limits, including the communities of Hazel Dell, Felida, Orchards and Salmon Creek. If county leaders had approved another major annexation plan in 2006, Vancouver would have surpassed Tacoma and Spokane to become the state's second-largest city. A 2025 proposal to annex the remaining urban growth area for Vancouver would expand the city limits by 56 square miles (150 km^{2}) and add approximately 171,000 to the city's population. It is estimated to add up to $50 million to the city's budget deficit due to the cost of providing services to the new areas. The 2025 annexation proposal would, like the proposal nearly 2 decades earlier, make Vancouver the state's second-largest city.

=== Military presence ===
During 1852–54, future United States President Ulysses S. Grant, then a captain in the U.S. Army, was quartermaster at what was then known as Columbia Barracks. Soon after leaving Vancouver, Grant resigned from the army and did not serve again until the outbreak of the American Civil War in 1861. Other notable generals to have served in Vancouver include George B. McClellan, Philip Sheridan, Oliver O. Howard and 1953 Nobel Peace Prize recipient George C. Marshall.

Army presence in Vancouver was very strong, as the Department of the Columbia built and moved to Vancouver Barracks, the military reservation for which stretched from the river to what is currently Fourth Plain Boulevard and was the largest Army base in the region until surpassed by Fort Lewis, 120 miles (190 km) to the north. Built on the old company gardens and skirmish range, Pearson Army Field (later Pearson Field) was a key facility, and at one point the US Army Signal Corps operated the largest spruce cut-up plant in the world to provide much-needed wood for airplanes. Vancouver became the end point for two ultra-long flights from Moscow, USSR, over the North Pole. The first of these flights was performed by Valery Chkalov in 1937 on a Tupolev ANT-25RD airplane. Chkalov was originally scheduled to land at an airstrip on Swan Island in nearby Portland, Oregon, but was redirected at the last minute to Vancouver's Pearson Airfield. In June 1975, a monument was dedicated commemorating the event near State Highway 14, then moved to the north side of Pearson Field in 1987. Chkalov Drive, in east Vancouver, was named in his honor.

== Geography ==
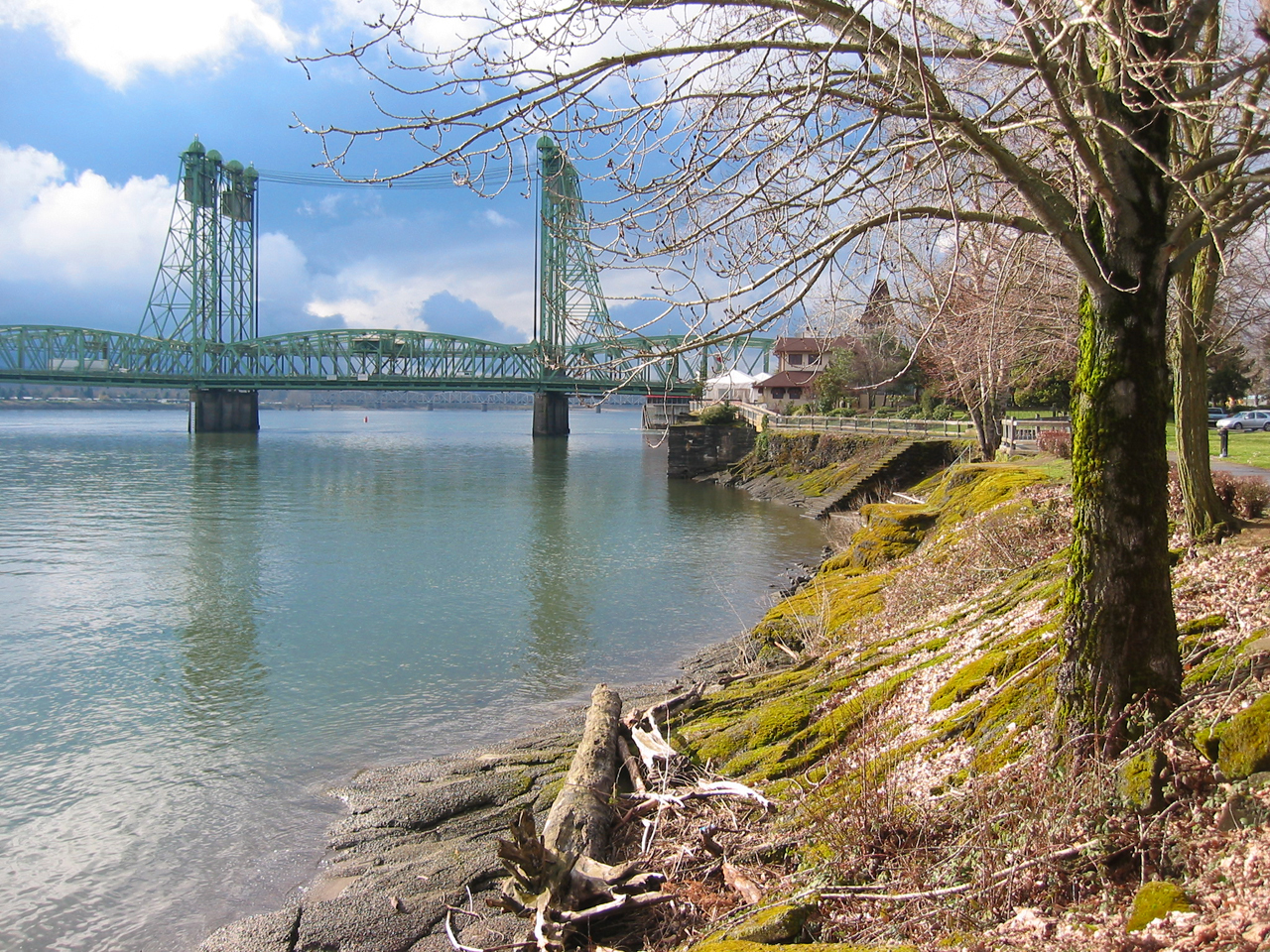
Columbia River waterfront

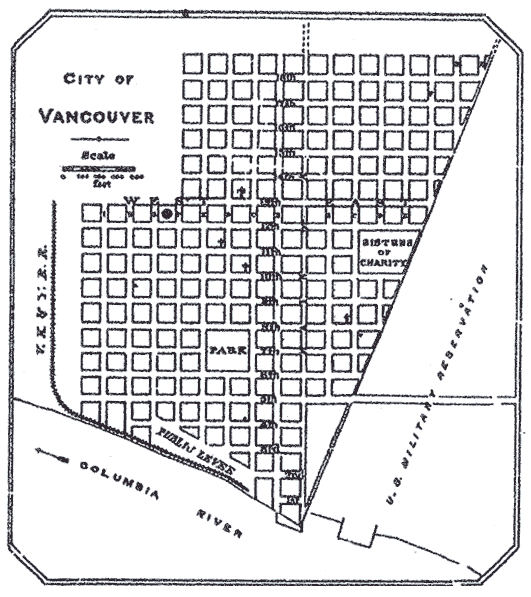
Vancouver map, 1888

Vancouver is located just north of the Columbia River and the Oregon border, just west of where the Columbia River Gorge bisects the volcanic Cascade Range and just east of where the Willamette River enters the Columbia. The city of Vancouver is in the Western Lowlands region of Washington. When clouds do not blanket the Puget–Willamette trough formed by the Cascade and Coast Range, Mount Hood, Mount St. Helens, Mount Rainier, Mount Jefferson and Mount Adams are all visible from Vancouver.

According to the United States Census Bureau, the city has a total area of 49.86 sq mi (129.1 km^{2}), of which 46.46 sq mi (120.3 km^{2}) is land and 3.4 sq mi (8.8 km^{2}) is water.

=== Climate ===
Vancouver lies just north of Portland, Oregon, with which it shares a similar climate. Both are classified as warm-summer Mediterranean (Csb) on the Köppen climate classification, but with certain key differences. High pressures east of the Cascade Range create something of a venturi effect, leading to cold east winds down the Columbia River Gorge. Unsheltered by the Willamette Valley, Vancouver has historically seen colder temperatures, including "silver thaw" storms where freezing rain cakes limbs and power lines. Such storms can paralyze Vancouver. This occasionally freezes the river, and in 1916 cut electric power in the city for almost two weeks. Rainfall occurs frequently throughout the fall, winter, and spring, but ceases around the middle of June, with dry and warm weather lasting through September. Average annual precipitation is 42 in (1,100 mm). Heavy snowfalls are infrequent and snow often falls and doesn't stick, with major snowstorms only occurring every 2–4 years. Close proximity to the river was also a concern for flooding, before dams constricted the river, destroying features such as Celilo Falls. Periodic floods have been a nuisance, with two of the most destructive occurring in June 1894 and May 1948. The 1948 Columbia River flood almost topped the Interstate Bridge's support piers and completely destroyed nearby Vanport, Oregon. Other unusual storms include the Columbus Day Storm of 1962 and a tornado that was rated F3 on the Fujita scale, which slammed into heavily populated central and east Vancouver, cutting a 9-mile path of destruction across the metropolitan area (including in neighboring Portland). It killed 6 people and injured 300 others, the deadliest tornado in the Pacific Northwest region on record. An EF1 tornado struck on January 10, 2008, just after noon, causing moderate damage along a two-mile (3.2 km) path from Vancouver Lake to the unincorporated Hazel Dell area.

Because many Vancouver residents work in Portland, there is typically significant rush-hour traffic congestion on two bridges that cross the Columbia River – the Interstate Bridge and the Glenn Jackson Bridge. In 2017 there were 297,932 weekday vehicle crossings on the two bridges.

Climate data for Vancouver, Washington (1991–2020 normals, extremes 1891–present)
Month	Jan	Feb	Mar	Apr	May	Jun	Jul	Aug	Sep	Oct	Nov	Dec	Year
Record high °F (°C)	66 (19)	73 (23)	83 (28)	90 (32)	99 (37)	115 (46)	108 (42)	108 (42)	103 (39)	90 (32)	72 (22)	66 (19)	115 (46)
Mean maximum °F (°C)	57.9 (14.4)	60.7 (15.9)	69.6 (20.9)	78.4 (25.8)	86.7 (30.4)	91.0 (32.8)	96.1 (35.6)	96.8 (36.0)	91.1 (32.8)	77.1 (25.1)	63.8 (17.7)	58.3 (14.6)	99.5 (37.5)
Mean daily maximum °F (°C)	47.0 (8.3)	51.0 (10.6)	56.1 (13.4)	61.2 (16.2)	68.3 (20.2)	73.5 (23.1)	80.9 (27.2)	81.6 (27.6)	75.8 (24.3)	63.7 (17.6)	53.0 (11.7)	46.5 (8.1)	63.2 (17.3)
Daily mean °F (°C)	40.7 (4.8)	43.1 (6.2)	47.2 (8.4)	51.7 (10.9)	58.3 (14.6)	63.3 (17.4)	69.0 (20.6)	69.4 (20.8)	63.9 (17.7)	54.2 (12.3)	46.2 (7.9)	40.8 (4.9)	54.0 (12.2)
Mean daily minimum °F (°C)	34.4 (1.3)	35.1 (1.7)	38.4 (3.6)	42.2 (5.7)	48.2 (9.0)	53.0 (11.7)	57.1 (13.9)	57.2 (14.0)	52.0 (11.1)	44.8 (7.1)	39.4 (4.1)	35.0 (1.7)	44.7 (7.1)
Mean minimum °F (°C)	22.0 (−5.6)	22.5 (−5.3)	27.3 (−2.6)	31.8 (−0.1)	36.8 (2.7)	43.9 (6.6)	48.3 (9.1)	48.0 (8.9)	41.7 (5.4)	32.3 (0.2)	25.9 (−3.4)	21.4 (−5.9)	16.8 (−8.4)
Record low °F (°C)	−8 (−22)	−3 (−19)	18 (−8)	24 (−4)	28 (−2)	34 (1)	37 (3)	35 (2)	28 (−2)	21 (−6)	6 (−14)	−10 (−23)	−10 (−23)
Average precipitation inches (mm)	5.34 (136)	3.77 (96)	3.95 (100)	2.93 (74)	2.51 (64)	1.61 (41)	0.42 (11)	0.52 (13)	1.43 (36)	3.41 (87)	5.51 (140)	6.07 (154)	37.47 (952)
Average snowfall inches (cm)	0.8 (2.0)	1.1 (2.8)	0.4 (1.0)	0.0 (0.0)	0.0 (0.0)	0.0 (0.0)	0.0 (0.0)	0.0 (0.0)	0.0 (0.0)	0.0 (0.0)	0.0 (0.0)	0.5 (1.3)	2.8 (7.1)
Average precipitation days (≥ 0.01 in.)	19.9	15.8	18.0	17.4	12.6	9.1	3.7	3.5	7.1	14.7	19.1	20.3	161.2
Average snowy days (≥ 0.1 in.)	0.3	0.8	0.2	0.0	0.0	0.0	0.0	0.0	0.0	0.0	0.0	0.5	1.4
Source: NOAA (snowfall and snowy days 1981-2010)

== Demographics ==
Historical population
Census	Pop.	Note	%±
1880	1,722		—
1890	3,545		105.9%
1900	3,126		−11.8%
1910	9,300		197.5%
1920	12,637		35.9%
1930	15,766		24.8%
1940	18,788		19.2%
1950	41,664		121.8%
1960	32,464		−22.1%
1970	41,859		28.9%
1980	42,834		2.3%
1990	46,380		8.3%
2000	143,560		209.5%
2010	161,791		12.7%
2020	190,915		18.0%
2025 (est.)	199,698		4.6%
U.S. Decennial Census; 2020 Census

=== Racial and ethnic composition ===
Vancouver, Washington – Racial and ethnic composition Note: the U.S. Census treats Hispanic/Latino as an ethnic category. This table excludes Latinos from the racial categories and assigns them to a separate category. Hispanics/Latinos may be of any race.
Race / Ethnicity (NH = Non-Hispanic)	Pop 2000	Pop 2010	Pop 2020	% 2000	% 2010	% 2020
White alone (NH)	117,958	123,347	126,109	82.17%	76.24%	66.06%
Black or African American alone (NH)	3,482	4,525	5,914	2.43%	2.80%	3.10%
Native American or Alaska Native alone (NH)	1,222	1,252	1,282	0.85%	0.77%	0.67%
Asian alone (NH)	6,423	8,039	10,198	4.47%	4.97%	5.34%
Pacific Islander alone (NH)	747	1,527	3,309	0.52%	0.94%	1.73%
Other race alone (NH)	206	242	959	0.14%	0.15%	0.50%
Mixed Race or Multi-Racial (NH)	4,487	6,103	12,603	3.13%	3.77%	6.60%
Hispanic or Latino (any race)	9,035	16,756	30,541	6.29%	10.36%	16.00%
Total	143,560	161,791	190,915	100.00%	100.00%	100.00%

=== 2020 census ===
As of the 2020 census, Vancouver had a population of 190,915, and the median age was 37.8 years. 21.2% of residents were under the age of 18, 6.2% were under the age of five, and 16.8% were 65 years of age or older. For every 100 females there were 96.2 males, and for every 100 females age 18 and over there were 94.0 males age 18 and over.

99.9% of residents lived in urban areas, while 0.1% lived in rural areas.

There were 78,026 households in Vancouver, of which 27.6% had children under the age of 18 living in them. Of all households, 40.7% were married-couple households, 20.7% were households with a male householder and no spouse or partner present, and 29.0% were households with a female householder and no spouse or partner present. About 30.3% of all households were made up of individuals and 12.3% had someone living alone who was 65 years of age or older. The average household size was 2.46 people.

There were 81,809 housing units, of which 4.6% were vacant. The homeowner vacancy rate was 0.8% and the rental vacancy rate was 5.3%.

The population density was 3,917.2/sq mi.

The median household income was $67,462, the per capita income was $36,053, and 12.7% of the population was below the poverty line.

The ancestry of the city is 16.1% German, 10.9% English, 9.7% Irish, 3.9% Norwegian, 2.9% Italian, 2.8% French, 1.5% Polish, and 0.7% Subsaharan African.

=== 2010 census ===
As of the 2010 census, there were 161,791 people, 65,691 households, and 40,246 families residing in the city. The population density was 3,482.4/sq mi (1,344.6/km^{2}). There were 70,005 housing units at an average density of 1,506.8/sq mi (581.8/km^{2}). The racial makeup of the city was 80.9% White, 2.9% African American, 1.0% Native American, 5.0% Asian, 1.0% Pacific Islander, 4.3% from other races, and 4.8% from two or more races. Hispanic or Latino people of any race were 10.4% of the population.

There were 65,691 households, of which 31.9% had children under the age of 18 living with them, 42.6% were married couples living together, 13.2% had a female householder with no husband present, 5.5% had a male householder with no wife present, and 38.7% were non-families. 30.0% of all households were made up of individuals, and 9.9% had someone living alone who was 65 years of age or older. The average household size was 2.43 and the average family size was 3.02.

The median age in the city was 35.9 years. 24% of residents were under the age of 18; 9.4% were between the ages of 18 and 24; 28.9% were from 25 to 44; 25.3% were from 45 to 64; and 12.4% were 65 years of age or older. The gender makeup of the city was 48.8% male and 51.2% female.

== Economy ==
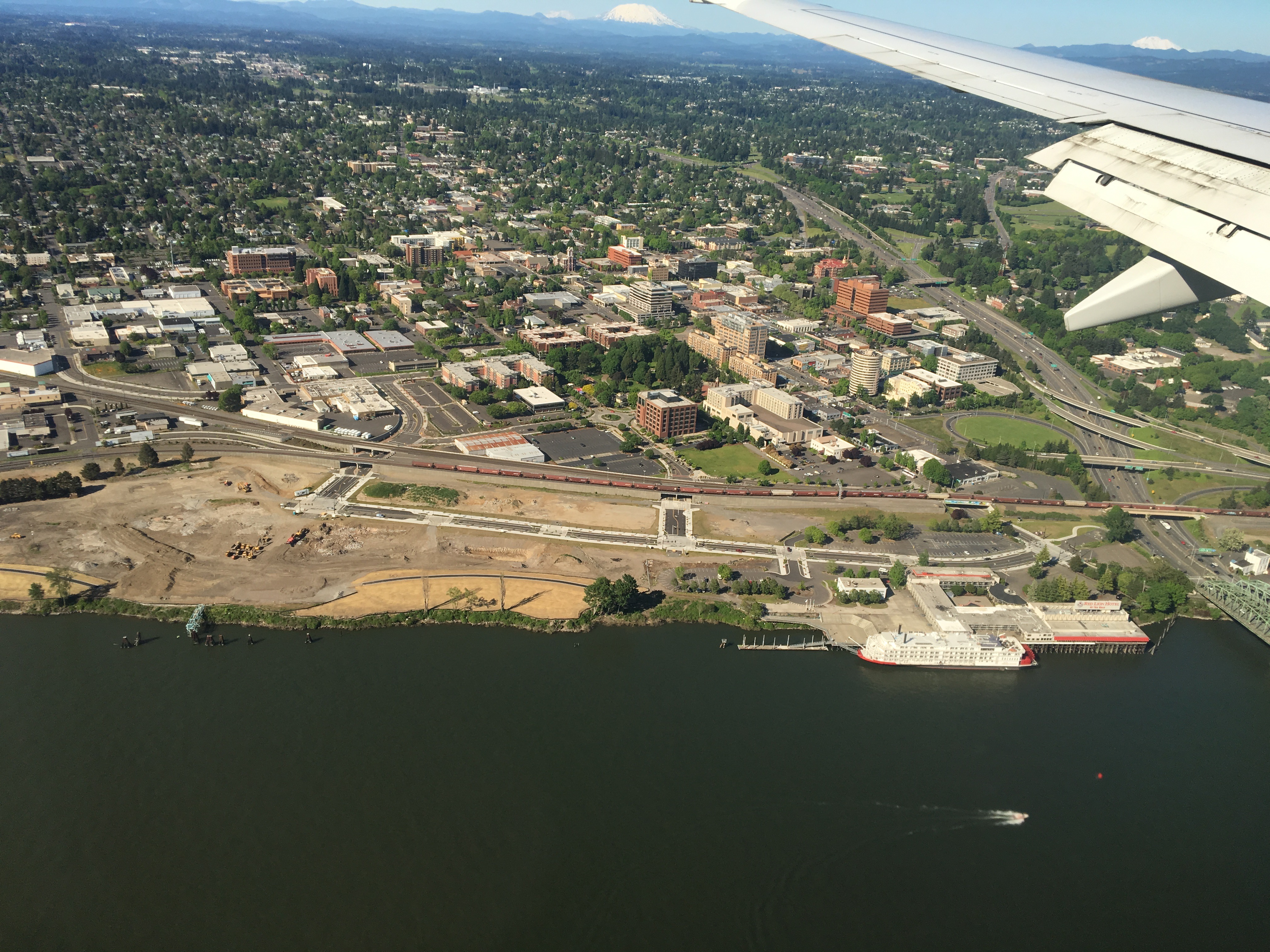
Aerial view of city

The Vancouver economy is characterized by border economics with neighboring Portland, Oregon. The state of Washington levies no individual or corporate income taxes and levies a property tax below the national average and a sales tax above the national median. The State of Oregon has even lower property taxes and no sales tax but one of the highest state income taxes. As a result, many Vancouver residents prefer to shop in neighboring Portland where they do not pay sales taxes, then live and work in Vancouver where they do not pay state income tax (though Washington residents who work in Oregon must pay Oregon income tax.) For the same reasons, the city is popular with retirees. Conversely, the city is less favored by students and young adults. In 2003, 70% of workers in Vancouver worked in Clark County. There is a risk in sales tax avoidance because Washington has a use tax due on all purchases made in Oregon that are then returned to Washington. Vancouver residents "shop at their own risk" when attempting to avoid the sales tax in Washington, although the rule is rarely, if ever, enforced except for purchases requiring registration, such as motor vehicles.

The taxation and demographics of the area depresses the retail sector of Vancouver's economy. Oregon has stricter development laws to protect the timber industry; therefore, Vancouver tends to attract a higher proportion of the region's sprawling development. The voting base also led to rejection of extension of Portland's light-rail system into the city for several years. In 2013, Washington transitioned away from being a control state.

The economic history of Vancouver reflects the region. Moving from a salmon- and trade-based indigenous economy by the Chinook people, the Hudson's Bay Company pioneered extractive industries such as the fur trade and timber. Subsistence agricultural gave way to market and export crops such as apples, strawberries and prunes. Largely bypassed by the railroad in the 1880s, when the Oregon Steam Navigation company would ferry trains across the river downstream from St. Helens, Oregon, to Kalama, Washington, early downtown development was focused around Washington Street (where ferries arrived), lumber and Vancouver Barracks activities such as a large spruce mill for manufacturing airplanes. A 1908 railroad swing bridge across the Columbia allowed greater industrial developments such as the Standifer Shipyard during the first world war. With the Interstate Bridge and Bonneville Dam Vancouver saw an industrial boom in the 1940s, including the Kaiser shipyard and Alcoa, as well as a Boise Cascade paper mill, just west of the Interstate Bridge.

As the old-growth forests were depleted and heavy industry left the United States, Vancouver's economy largely changed to high tech and service industry jobs, with many residents commuting to Portland. Vancouver contains the corporate headquarters for Nautilus, Inc., ZoomInfo, Papa Murphy's Pizza and The Holland (parent company of the Burgerville restaurant chain).

The Port of Vancouver USA operates a port on the Columbia River, which separates Oregon to the south and Washington to the north. It handles over 400 ocean-going vessels annually, as well as a number of barges which ply the river and its tributaries as far as Lewiston, Idaho.

The Vancouver Energy project was a proposed crude oil transport hub in the Port of Vancouver USA. It was estimated to produce the equivalent of $1.6 billion in employment income during the terminal's construction and for its first 15 years of operation. Vancouver Energy ended its bid to build the hub in February 2018 following Governor Jay Inslee's rejection of the project.

In 2017, there were 4,550 employer firms. 2,143 of these firms were shown to be owned by men, and 943 were shown to be owned by women. 556 of the firms were shown to be owned by minorities, and 3,234 were not shown to be owned by minorities. 241 of these firms were owned by veterans.

According to reporting by Axios, city leaders have stated that since 2021 the city has seen a 38% increase in new business starts, with 96% of all city businesses being classified as small.

=== Largest employers ===
According to the city's 2022 Annual Comprehensive Financial Report, the largest employers in the city are:

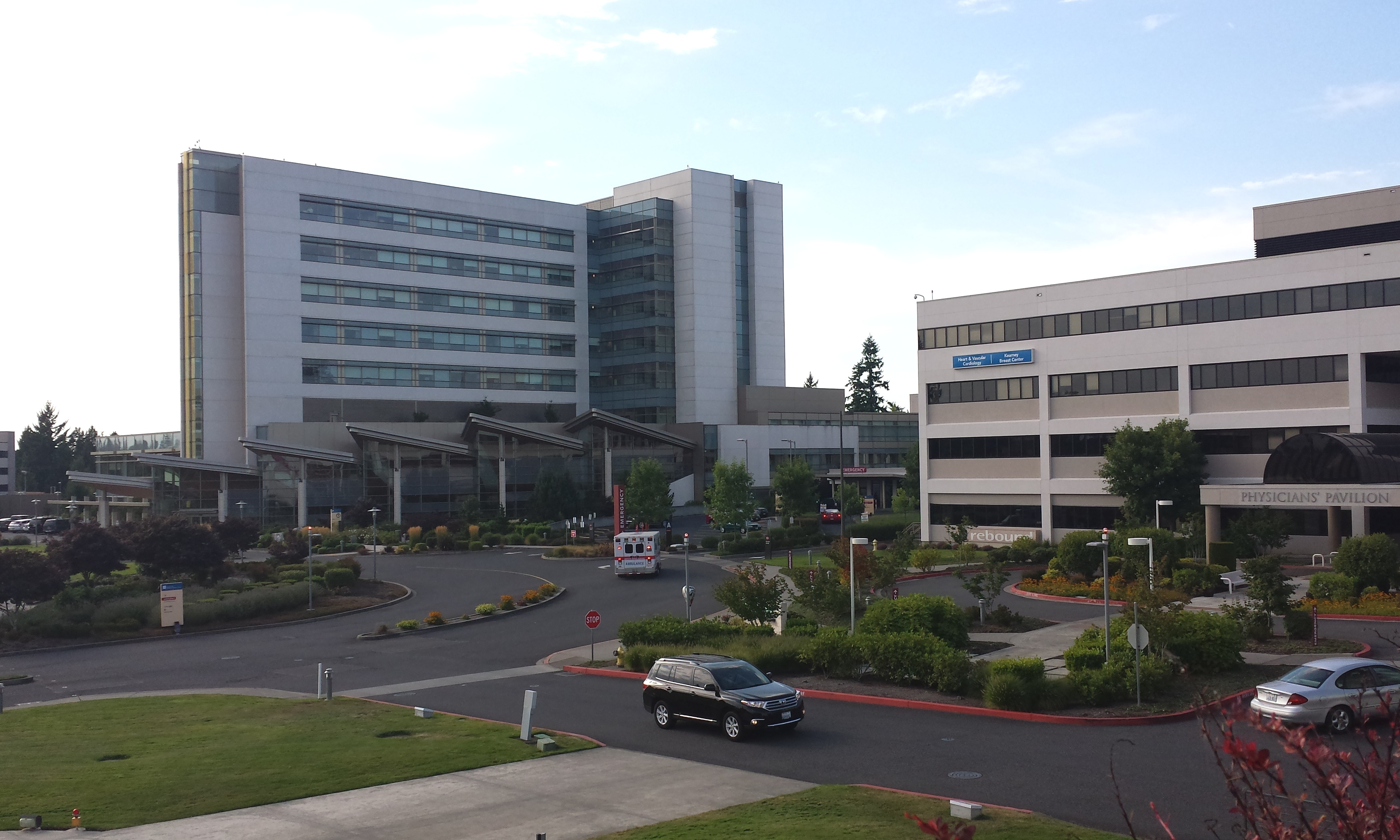
PeaceHealth Southwest Medical Center is the largest employer in Vancouver.

#	Employer	# of Employees
1	PeaceHealth	16,500
2	Vancouver Public Schools	2,957
3	Evergreen Public Schools	2,203
4	Vancouver Clinic	1,452
5	Battle Ground Public Schools	1,380
6	SEH America Inc.	867
7	Dick Hannah Dealerships	659
8	Columbia Machine Inc.	535
9	Tapani Inc.	500
10	Clark County Public Transportation Benefit	431

=== Downtown revitalization ===
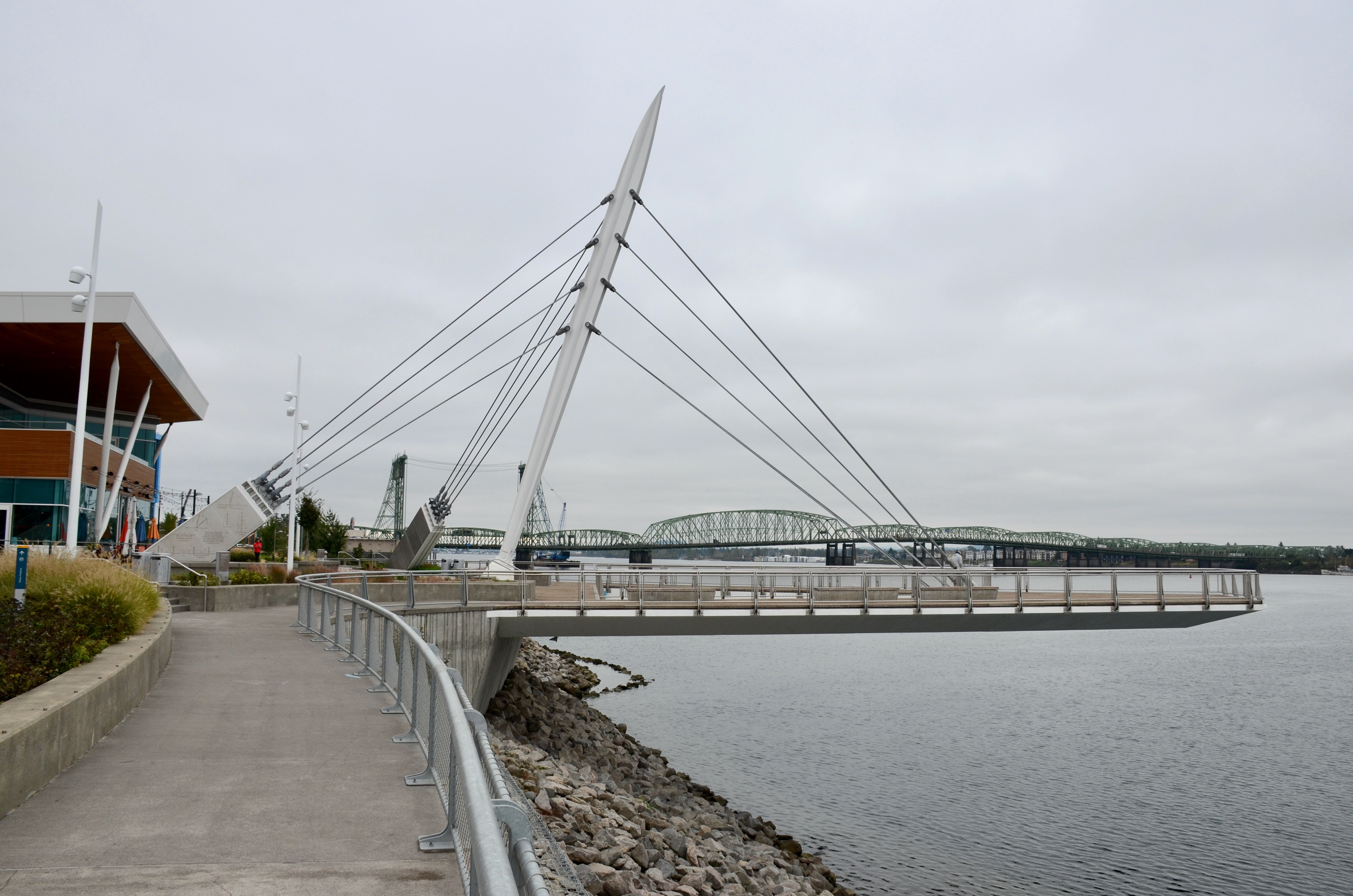
Grant Street Pier, on Vancouver waterfront

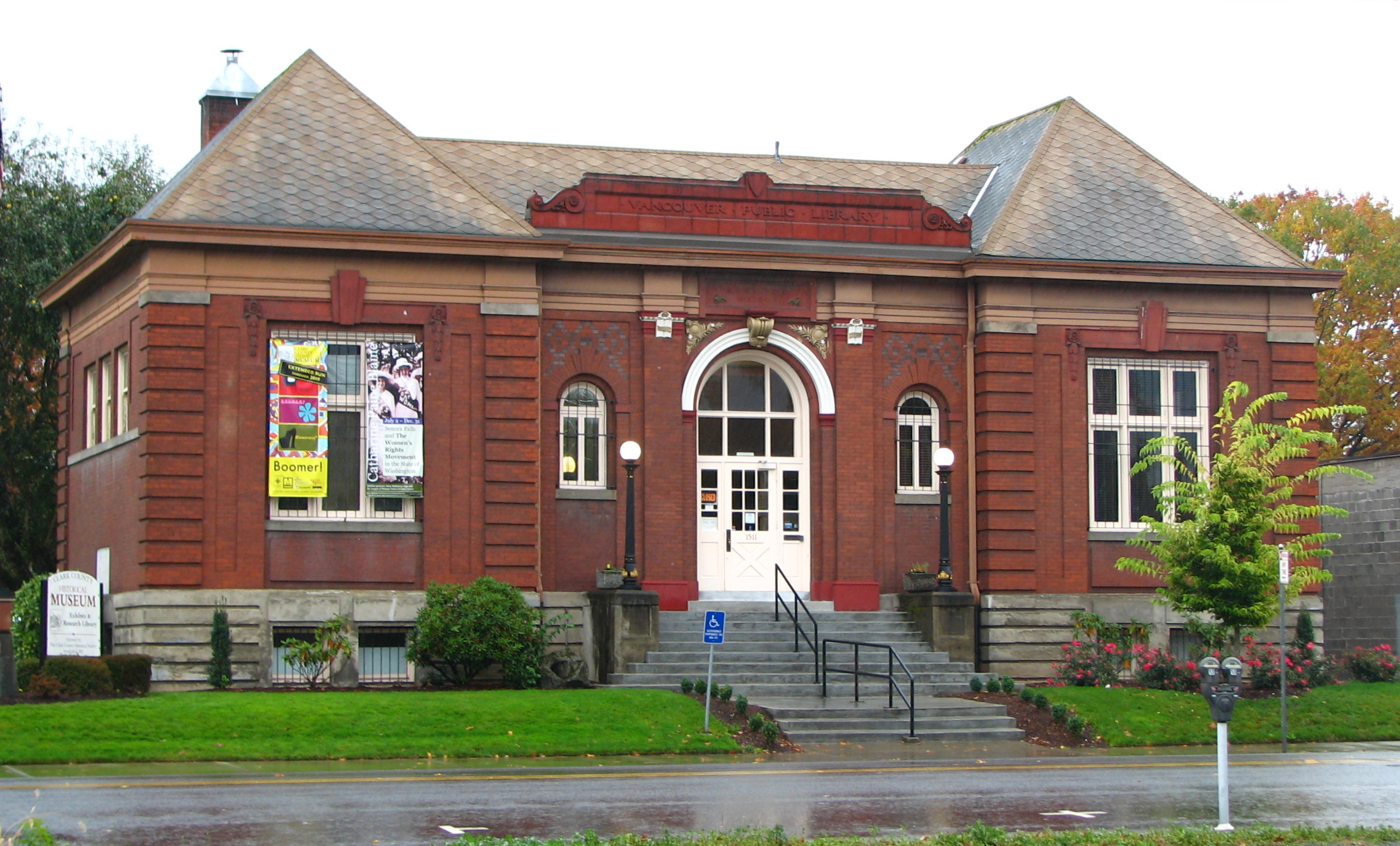
Clark County Historical Museum

In 1997, the city of Vancouver decided to dedicate the next 15–20 years to redeveloping and revitalizing the downtown core, west of I-5 and south of Evergreen Boulevard. The first projects started in the early 2000s with the construction of many tall condominium structures around Esther Short Park. The most lauded outside investment was the construction of a Hilton hotel directly across from the park. The Downtown redevelopment of Vancouver continued after a slowdown during the 2009–2012 recession. Numerous projects began to rise up around the city core and as of mid-2020 more than three dozen projects with mid-rise or high-rise structures were completed, under construction, or proposed.

In 2016 the first ground was broken for the $1.5 billion, 21-block redevelopment of Vancouver's waterfront at the former site of Boise Cascade Paper Mill. The site had been inaccessible to the public for more than 100 years. The project was planned for 3,300 residential units, and roughly 1 million square feet (93,000 m^{2}) of office and retail space. Around 15,000 people were in attendance for the official grand opening, in 2018, of the project and associated public space including Grant Street Pier, a cable-stayed viewing deck that extends out over the Columbia River.

The Redevelopment of Terminal One master plan was approved by the city council in 2017. This $500 million project will include multiple phases over several years including a seven-story AC Marriott hotel that began site preparation and construction in late 2019. Future plans in the master plan called for a mixed-use complex of mid-rise buildings on four blocks and a complete rebuild of the original 100-year-old Terminal One dock and pier. A public open-air market is also planned.

The Columbian newspaper moved to a new seven-story office building adjacent to the Hilton in 2008. Two years later, The Columbian filed for Chapter 11 bankruptcy and the building defaulted to Bank of America. In June 2010, the City of Vancouver agreed to purchase the office building for use as a new city hall for $18.5 million, a fraction of the $41.5 million sale price the owners of The Columbian office building had been asking prior to filing for bankruptcy. In 2011, the city consolidated five separate buildings housing 300 employees into the new building, located at 415 W. 6th Street. The move saved the city approximately $1 million a year in facility lease and maintenance costs.

The Fort Vancouver Regional Library District opened a new library on C Street at Evergreen Boulevard in 2011. Future plans on C Street include a new Marriott hotel and roughly 250 new condominiums.

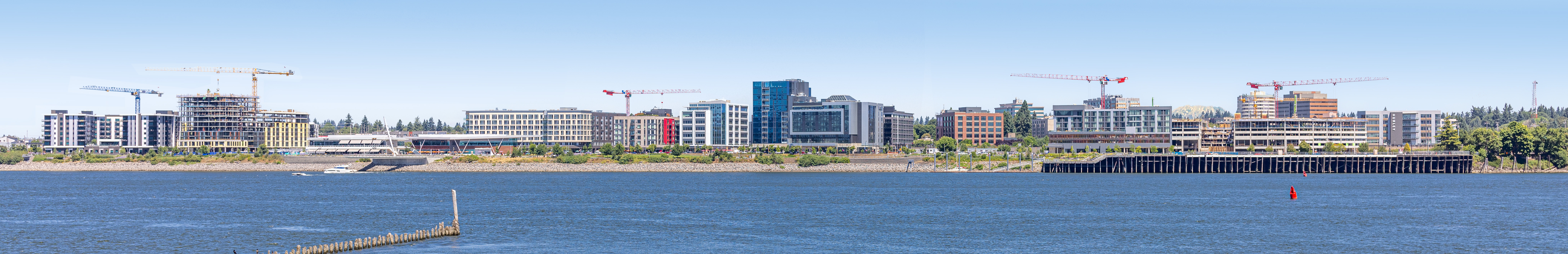
Panoramic scrolling image of Vancouver skyline taken from Hayden Island in 2023

== Government ==
Vancouver relies on a council–manager form of government composed of seven city council members including a non-partisan mayor's office. The mayor and council members serve four year terms. As is common in council-manager municipal government, the council oversees legislative issues such as local ordinances, while executive and administrative leadership is carried out by a city manager hired by the council. Vancouver also serves as the seat of Clark County and its associated county manager and council.

== Arts and culture ==
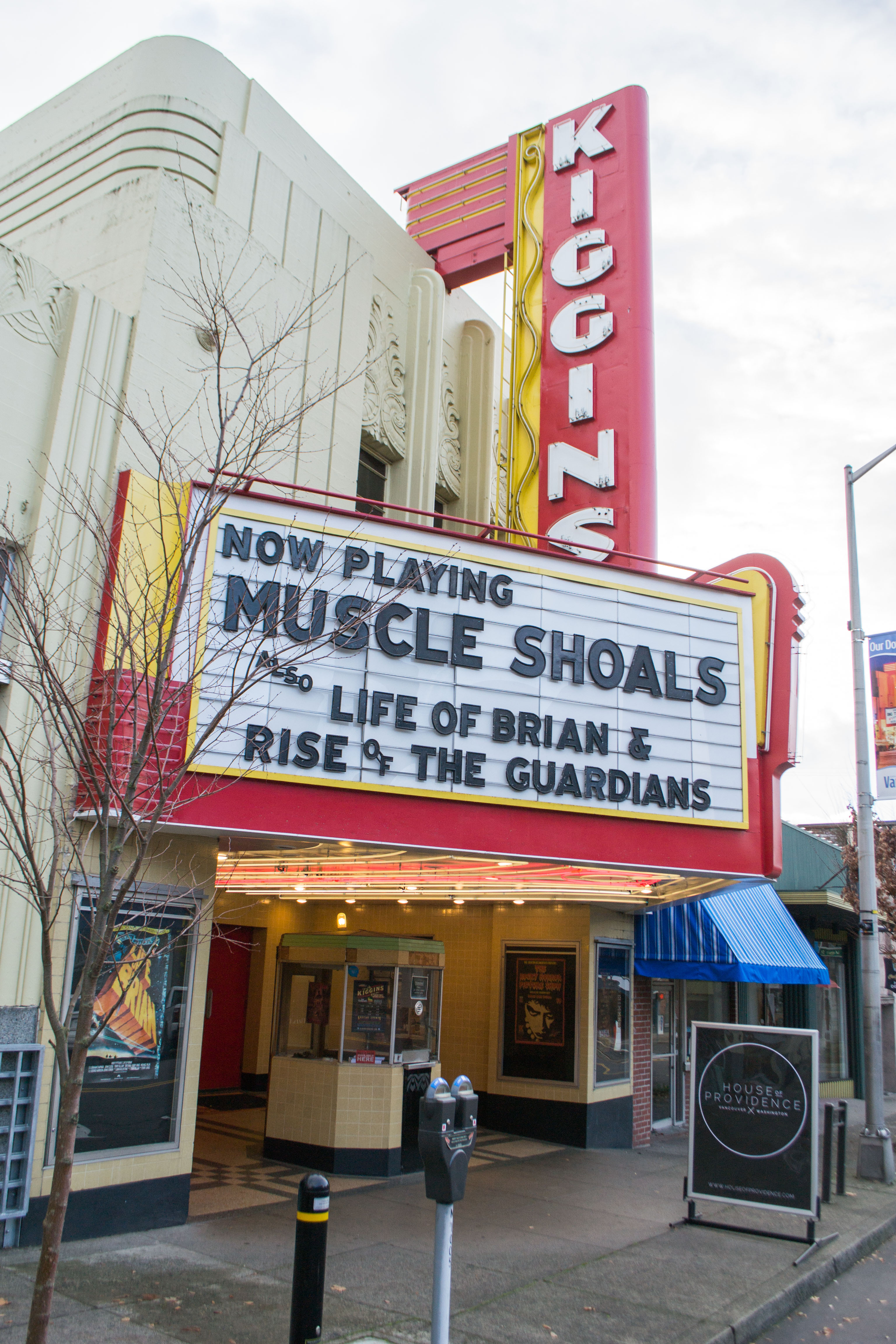
Kiggins Theatre

In the early 2000s, Vancouver began seeing a revitalization of the local arts scene and cultural events. In 2010 there was a movement among local artists to form cooperatives and meet with established local gallery owners for a monthly forum known as "Art Conversations". Many of Vancouver's art galleries are located in downtown Vancouver, and in 2014, the City Council formally designated an "Arts District" in the downtown core.

The Kiggins Theatre located within the Downtown Vancouver Art District, was built in 1936 by architect Day Hillborn. It was named for J.P. Kiggins, an entrepreneur and politician who cut a swath through town in the early 20th century, serving as Vancouver's mayor for 15 non-consecutive years between 1908 and 1935. It was renovated and reopened in 2011 as an independent film and community event venue.

The Vancouver Symphony Orchestra first formed in the late 1970s. Conducted and directed by Dr. Salvadore Brotons, the Symphony regularly performs concerts.

=== Annual events ===
Every June since 2006, the Recycled Arts Festival held in Esther Short Park has featured the work of dozens of artists whose creations are made from at least 75% reused or recycled materials, along with live music and food.

Since the mid-1960s, Vancouver has hosted a Fourth of July fireworks display on the grounds of Fort Vancouver National Historic Site that draws many people to the city. The display routinely ran to 45 minutes, attracted up to 60,000 visitors and was broadcast on area television, one of the largest west of the Mississippi River. Due to the death of key organizer "Mister Fireworks" Jim Larson and economic conditions during the Great Recession, the show was not held in 2009. A shorter, redesigned show debuted in 2010 and brought in approximately 35,000 people. As of 2019, The Historic Trust (formerly the "Fort Vancouver National Trust") continues to organize the fireworks event. The fireworks were not held in 2020 or 2021 due to COVID-19.

4 Days of Aloha, also known as the Hawaiian Festival, takes place in late July in Esther Short Park, Clark College, and Fort Vancouver. Started in 2012 by "Aunty" Deva Yamashiro, a hula dancer and self-appointed cultural ambassador for Hawaii, the festival features live music, dance performances, craft workshops, and a celebration of Hawaiian food, arts, and culture.

Late August features the Vancouver Wine and Jazz Festival in Esther Short Park, which brought 13,500 attendees in 2012 and which is considered the largest jazz festival in the Pacific Northwest.

=== Architecture and notable buildings ===
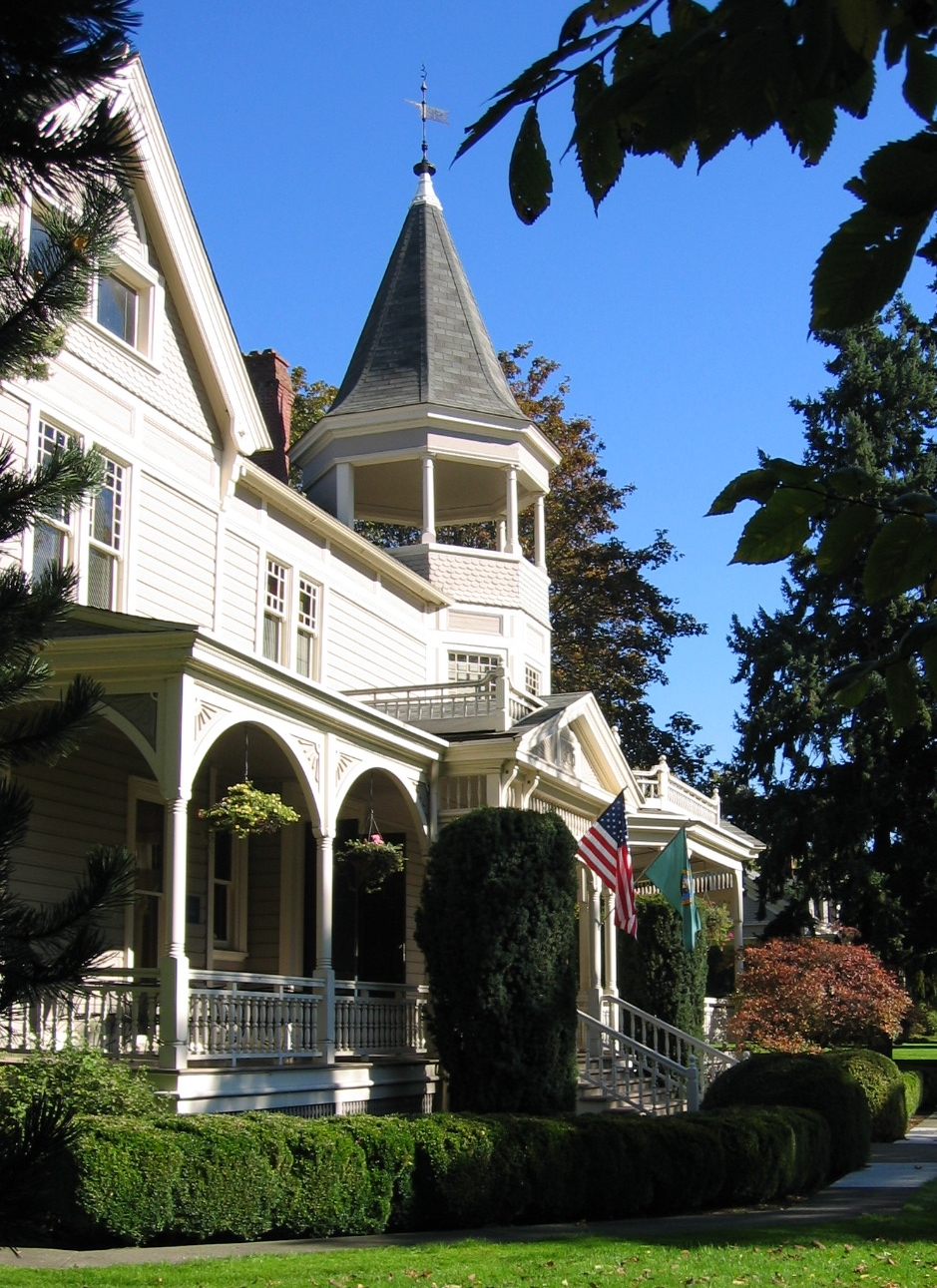
The Marshall House in Officers Row, built in 1886 and later named after George C. Marshall

Mother Joseph was one of the first architects in the region, and because of its relatively long history, Vancouver contains a variety of buildings. Homes vary from Victorians and craftsman bungalows downtown, to small wartime tract housing and ranch-styles mid-town, with rural styles and larger homes in the outer ring. In addition to the reconstructed Fort Vancouver at the Fort Vancouver National Historic Site, the city was named one of the National Register of Historic Places' "Dozen Distinctive Destinations" for 2003.

Other notable buildings in Vancouver include:

- The Covington House at 4201 Main Street, a log cabin and boarding school built 1846–1848
- Officers Row, including the Grant House (first house on the Columbia Barracks) and the Queen Anne-style 1866 Marshall House
- Mother Joseph's Providence Academy, dedicated in 1873, where Evergreen Boulevard crosses Interstate 5
- The Proto-Cathedral of St. James the Greater (formerly St. James Church) saw its first Roman Catholic Mass celebrated August 16, 1885
- The Carnegie library at Sixteenth and Main, which opened on New Year's Eve 1909, to showcase its unusual electric lights; it is now the site of the Clark County Historical Museum
- The 1914 Chicago-style U.S. National Bank (now the Heritage Building) at sixth and Main
- The 1916 U.S. Post Office at 1211 Daniels Street
- The vertical-lift Interstate Bridge, which opened on February 14, 1917, Oregon's 58th anniversary
- The 1935 art deco telephone exchange building at Eleventh and Washington
- The 1941 Clark County Courthouse, designed by prolific local architect Day Hillborn
- Smith Tower, a round downtown apartment building for the elderly, built in 1965
- The Hilton Hotel and Vancouver Convention Center across from Esther Short Park

Many of these buildings have been repurposed. The 1867 Slocum House, an Italianate villa-style residence originally built one block south of its current location in Esther Short Park, was moved to its present location in 1966 and now houses a winery and art gallery. The Carnegie Library was expanded in the 1940s, becoming the Clark County Historical Museum after a new library was built in 1963. Other buildings have been torn down for urban renewal or renovated to house professional offices for lawyers and accountants.

== Education ==
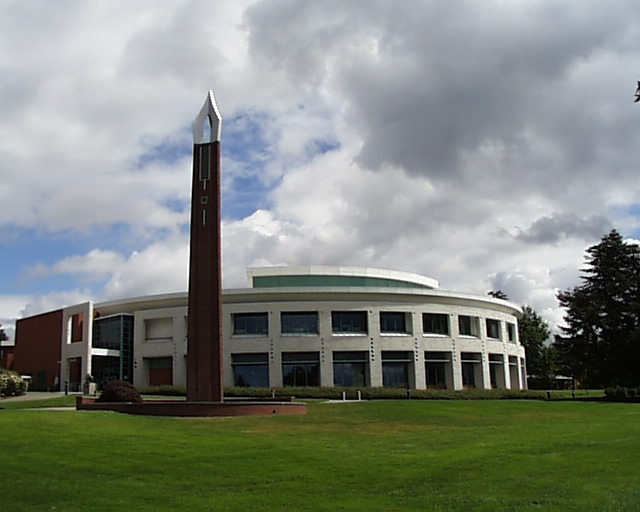
Clark College chime tower, with the Cannell library in the background

Skyview High School

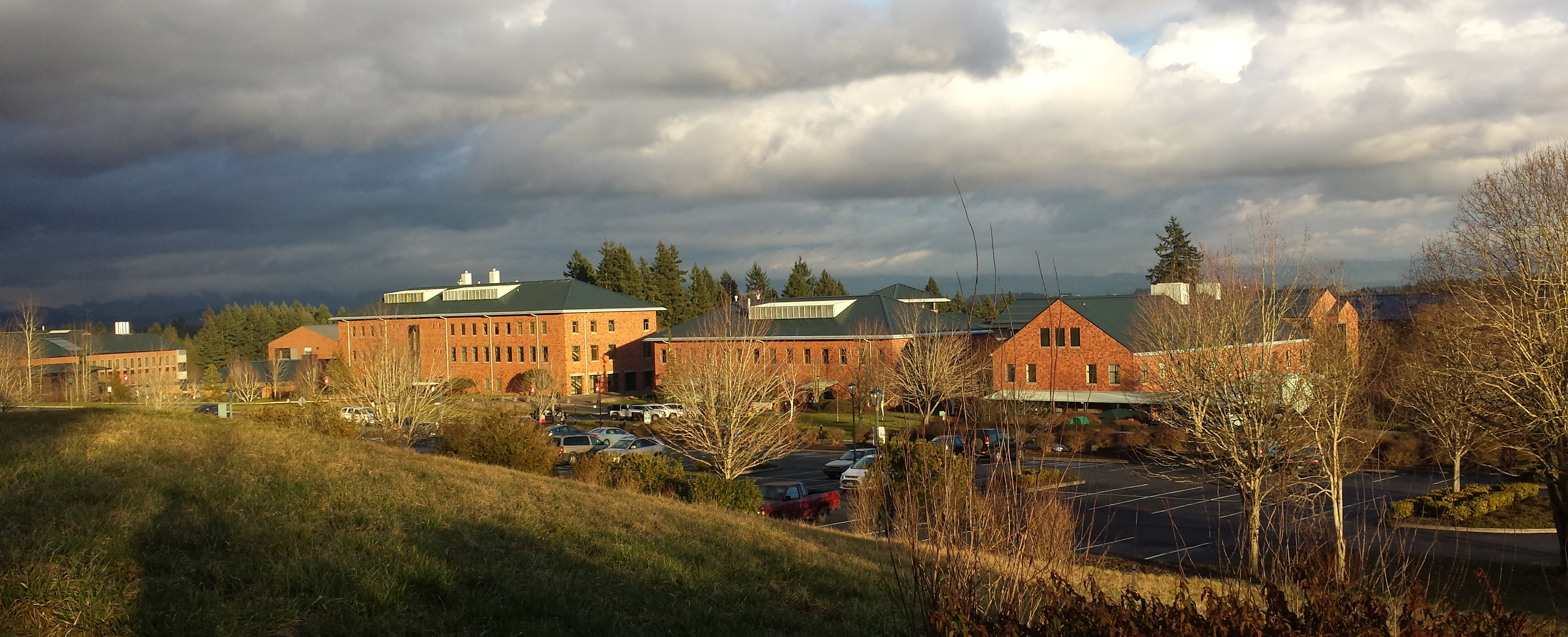
Washington State University Vancouver in January 2014

=== Public schools ===
Vancouver is primarily served by two school districts: Vancouver Public Schools and Evergreen Public Schools. Small portions of the city also lie in the Camas School District to the east and Battle Ground School District to the north.

The Vancouver Public Schools cover most of west Vancouver and has six high schools: Hudson's Bay High School, Columbia River High School, Fort Vancouver High School, Skyview High School, Vancouver School of Arts and Academics, and Vancouver iTech Preparatory (grades 6–12). It also has 6 middle schools and 23 elementary schools. Evergreen Public Schools covers most of east Vancouver and has six high schools: Evergreen High School, Mountain View High School, Henrietta Lacks Health and Bioscience High School, Heritage High School, Union High School, and Legacy High School. The district has 6 middle schools and 22 elementary schools.

Vancouver is also home to the Washington School for the Deaf and Washington School for the Blind. Both institutions were established by the territorial government in 1886 and initially shared a campus until they were separated in 1913.

=== Colleges and universities ===
- Clark College (two-year)
- Gateway Seminary
- Washington State University, Vancouver

== Media ==
Vancouver is located within the Portland media market for print, radio, and television media. The Oregonian, based in Portland, is the largest newspaper in the region and maintained a Vancouver bureau until 2008. Vancouver has its own daily newspaper, The Columbian, that has been published since 1890 and is independently owned. An alternative weekly named The Vancouver Voice was published from 2006 to 2011.

== Infrastructure ==
=== Transportation ===
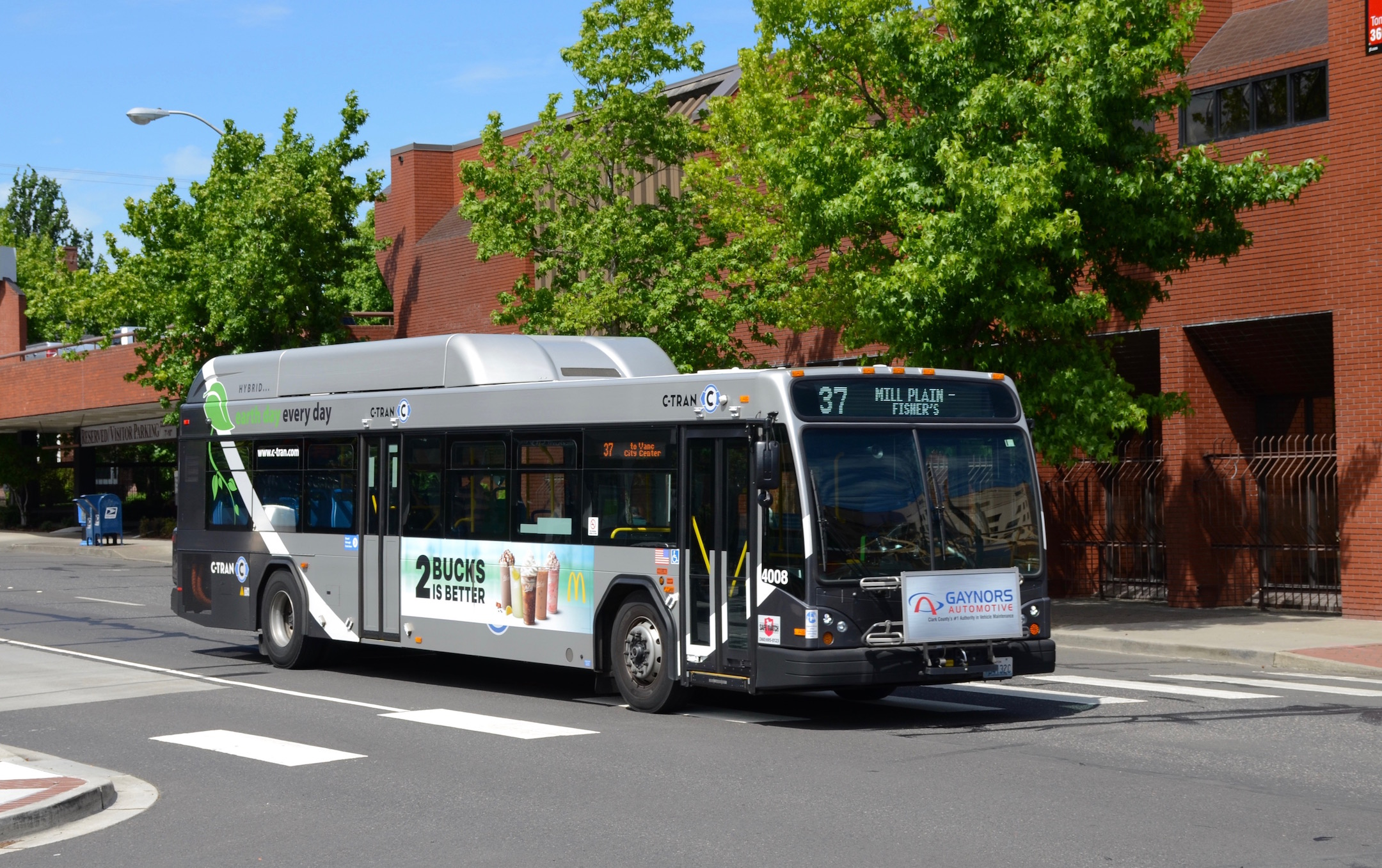
Vancouver's public transit service is provided by C-Tran.

Vancouver has two interstate freeways, I-5 and I-205, both of which run north–south, across the Columbia River into Portland and toward Seattle. It also has two heavily travelled state highways within the city limits. SR 14 begins at I-5 in downtown Vancouver and makes its way east. It is a freeway all the way until Camas. SR 500 begins from I-5 at 39th Street in north Vancouver, travels east connecting with I-205, and continues east into the suburb of Orchards where the freeway terminates at Fourth Plain Boulevard, and meets with the south end of north–south-oriented 117th Ave., SR 503. A third state highway, SR 501, starts at I-5 and heads west through downtown and continues along a path that runs between the Columbia River and Vancouver Lake.

The area's mass transit system is C-Tran, the Clark County Public Transportation Benefit Area Authority, which operates 135 buses, vanpools, and paratransit vehicles. There are also a number of express routes into Portland's downtown.

There have been multiple discussions about extending Portland's Max Light Rail system into Vancouver. In 1995, Clark County voters rejected a ballot measure that would have funded a light rail extension north into Vancouver. Opposition to paying for light rail was strong at that time, but slowly declined over the following several years, eventually leading Vancouver officials to begin discussing the idea again. Meanwhile, TriMet reconstituted its planned MAX line to Vancouver as a shorter line running only within Portland, which could potentially be extended across the river and into Clark County at a later date. This extension of the MAX system opened in 2004 as the Yellow Line, running as far north as the Portland Expo Center, approximately 1 mile (2 km) south of downtown Vancouver. In 2012, Vancouver voters rejected a sales tax proposal to fund light rail operations in connection with the Columbia River Crossing proposal. In 2022, the Interstate Bridge Replacement Program included a new proposal for a light rail extension into downtown Vancouver, with stops at the Vancouver Waterfront and Evergreen Boulevard.

Vancouver has always been well served by rail; current freight railroads operating in Vancouver include the BNSF, Union Pacific, and the local shortline Lewis and Clark Railway. Amtrak, the national passenger rail system, provides service to Vancouver Station. The long-distance Coast Starlight and Empire Builder serve the city, as well as the regional Amtrak Cascades.

Pearson Field, located near downtown Vancouver, is the main airport serving the city. The airport is intended primarily for general aviation without any commercial air service. The nearest commercial airport is Portland International Airport (PDX).

== Sports ==
The Vancouver Bears of the United States Basketball League (USBL) have played at Hudson's Bay High School since 2022.

== Sister cities ==
Vancouver has one sister city:

- Jōyō, Kyoto, Kansai, Japan

Vancouver previously had a sister-city relationship with Arequipa, Peru, between 1961 and 1993, but that relationship ended.
