= Gaylord Container Corporation =

Defunct American packing material manufacturer

- Type: Public
- Traded as: AMEX: GCR (AMEX)
- Industry: Paper, packaging, chemicals
- Predecessors: Gaylord Container, Ltd. (1986); Crown Zellerbach (Gaylord) Container Division (1955–1986); Gaylord Container Corp. (1925–1955)
- Founded: 1986 (original co. – 1925)
- Defunct: 2002
- Fate: acquired by Temple-Inland
- Headquarters: 500 Lake Cook Road, Suite 400; Deerfield, Illinois, U.S.
- Key people: Marvin A. Pomerantz, Warren J. Hayford; Anson Goodyear
- Products: Kraft paper, corrugated containers, DMSO
- Revenue: $1.04 billion (2001) $1.17 billion (2000)
- Net income: –$27.3 million (loss, 2001) $2.4 million (2000)
- Number of employees: 4,800

Gaylord Container Corporation (AMEX: GCR) was an American integrated manufacturer of packaging materials, primarily corrugated containers. Operating from 1986 until 2002, most of the company's facilities were originally part of Crown Zellerbach's container division. Based in Deerfield, Illinois, a suburb north of Chicago, Gaylord Container completed its initial public offering in July 1988 and was listed on the American Stock Exchange. After less than 16 years as a company, it was acquired by a competitor, Temple-Inland, in early 2002, which was acquired by International Paper a decade later in 2012.

== Company history ==
=== Origins ===
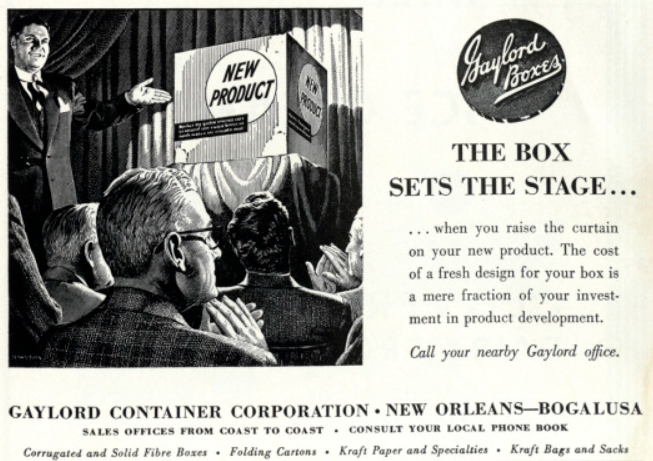
1956 advertisement for the Gaylord Container Corporation

Gaylord Container was a by-product of the hostile takeover of Crown Zellerbach by Sir James Goldsmith in July 1985, which resulted in the break-up of the San Francisco-based forest products corporation in May 1986. The more profitable manufacturing assets (fine paper mills) were sold to the James River Corporation of Richmond, Virginia (which merged with Fort Howard and became Fort James in 1997, then was acquired by Georgia-Pacific in 2000). The less profitable container division (brown paper) of CZ became "Gaylord Container," and after a brief period as a limited partnership, was sold in November 1986 for $260 million to a group of Midwest investors led by Warren Hayford and Marvin Pomerantz. They headed Mid-America Packaging, a single kraft paper mill in Pine Bluff, Arkansas, acquired from Weyerhaeuser in December 1985 for $28 million. Soon after the acquisition of the former Crown Zellerbach assets, the headquarters of Gaylord Container were moved from One Bush Street in San Francisco to Illinois.

The company was named for a previous company of the same name, which made the eponymous Gaylord container, and was based in St. Louis, Missouri. It was acquired by Crown Zellerbach in 1955, which renamed its brown paper operations the "Gaylord Container Division." The Gaylord name remained in CZ into the early 1980s, then was reduced to "Container Division" shortly before the hostile takeover.

=== Facilities ===
Primary locations in the United States

At its initiation in 1986, Gaylord Container had three paper mills (containerboard), located in Antioch, California, Bogalusa, Louisiana, and Baltimore, Ohio, with converting plants in twelve states. In 1937, Gaylord Container Corp. had acquired the Bogalusa-based Great Southern Lumber Company and its Bogalusa Paper Mill. The mill of Mid-America Packaging in Pine Bluff, Arkansas, was integrated into Gaylord Container in June 1988. The Ohio mill was sold for $17 million in November 1988, it produced only the less-profitable corrugating medium from recycled pulp.

The Antioch mill in northern California (midway between San Francisco and Sacramento) had used 100% recycle pulp since 1977, and had a gas turbine co-generation facility, installed in 1982. The mill and adjacent converting complex was opened in 1957 by Crown Zellerbach to use pulp from British Columbia to make tissue, toweling, multiwall bags, and linerboard for the northern California market. The pulp was delivered by company ship to the Antioch mill's deep-water dock on the San Joaquin River. Eventually the consumer products were phased out and the mill downsized to a single Fourdrinier paper machine (260 in (22 ft; 6.6 m) wide), which produced linerboard and corrugating medium for corrugated boxes. Recycled pulp from the adjacent Secondary Fiber mill was first produced in 1969, reclaimed from old corrugated containers (OCC) and initially used as an extender for virgin pulp. Within eight years the mill's fiber supply was 100% recycle for all its grades of linerboard and medium, and for nearly a decade the Antioch mill was home of the "World's Largest Recycle Paper Machine."

In March 1988, Gaylord Container acquired the adjacent Fibreboard kraft pulp and paper mill from Louisiana-Pacific and it became the California east mill. Despite a $50 million infusion to revive the 1949 facility, problems with wood chip supplies and prices on the West Coast, antiquated equipment, and air quality issues forced the east mill to shut down within three years, in February 1991, eliminating 320 jobs. Shortly after the acquisition by Temple-Inland, the west mill was idled in September 2002, due to over-capacity of papermaking within the newly expanded company. The Antioch gas-turbine power plant continued to operate, selling electricity to the local utility (PG&E) until shut down in February 2006. Both mill sites east of Antioch (north of Wilbur Road) were demolished and leveled. (38.013°N 121.775°W)

Gaylord Container also operated a DMSO facility in Bogalusa, now Gaylord Chemical Corporation, adjacent to its pulp and paper operations.

=== Acquisition ===
After less than sixteen years as a company, it was acquired by a competitor, Temple-Inland, in early 2002, which was acquired by International Paper a decade later in 2012.

== See also ==
- Great Southern Lumber Company
- Gaylord Chemical Corporation
- Temple-Inland
- International Paper
