= Gaylord Chemical Corporation =

New Orleans company headquarters

The company headquarters of Gaylord Chemical Company LLC, now known as gChem, is located in Covington, Louisiana, USA. The company's original manufacturing facility located in Bogalusa, Louisiana was shut down and demolished in 2010, when operations relocated to Tuscaloosa, Alabama, USA. The company has manufactured dimethyl sulfoxide (DMSO) and dimethyl sulfide (DMS) continuously since the early 1960s.

Prior to its acquisition by its management team in 2007 Gaylord operated as a wholly owned subsidiary of Temple-Inland Inc. (NYSE: TIN). After the ownership transition was complete it continued to operate from its Slidell office, which had been established in the late 1980s. Gaylord announced expanded DMSO production capacity in Tuscaloosa, Alabama, which came on-line in 2010.

Prior to being a subsidiary of Temple-Inland, Gaylord Chemical was a division of Gaylord Container Corporation, the successor (1986–2002) of the brown paper division of Crown Zellerbach (1928–86).

In 2025, Gaylord Chemical changed its name to gChem.

== Origin as part of Crown Zellerbach's Chemical Product Division ==
Crown Zellerbach (CZ), the San Francisco-based forest products company, developed the DMS/DMSO manufacturing technology in use by Gaylord today. CZ built the original DMSO plant in the 1960s at the site where Gaylord Chemical operated until mid-year 2010.

Crown Zellerbach's research and development facility was located in Camas, Washington. A focus of the Chemical Products Division was to develop chemicals derived from paper industry by-products, to complement the company's established pulp and paper business. The oxidation technology used by Gaylord Chemical to make DMSO was developed at the Camas R&D lab by David Goheen and coworkers.

Crown Zellerbach was the object of a hostile takeover by James Goldsmith in mid-1985, which split up the corporation in May 1986. The majority of its manufacturing assets (fine paper mills) were acquired by the James River Corporation of Richmond, Virginia (which became Fort James in 1997, acquired in 2000 by Georgia-Pacific). The remaining CZ assets were divided between timber holdings (primarily in Canada), and the brown paper division, which became Gaylord Container Corporation in November 1986, and relocated its headquarters to Deerfield, Illinois, a Chicago suburb. After less than 16 years as a company, Gaylord was acquired by rival Temple-Inland in 2002.

== 1995 Railcar accident ==
In 1995 a railroad tank car at the Bogalusa facility vented its contents when pressure overwhelmed its rupture disc. The railcar contained dinitrogen tetroxide which was used as a process oxidant. The subsequent release forced an evacuation of about 3,000 people within a one-mile (1.6 km) radius of the plant. Lawsuits filed against Gaylord Chemical Corporation and Vicksburg Chemical (dinitrogen tetroxide supplier) were settled in May 2005. A follow-up investigation determined that the accident occurred as a result of mixing of the railcar's contents with water.

The incident had a strong effect on the process and personnel safety management system in the corporation and catalyzed an effort to improve safety performance. By 2008 Gaylord Chemical was recognized by the Louisiana Chemical Association (LCA) for this work and was named as a Class 1 "Best in Louisiana" SAFE award winner.

== Gaylord Process Technology ==
The chemical process formerly used in Bogalusa to manufacture DMSO and dimethyl sulfide (DMS) was unique in that it ultimately relied on biorenewable inputs.

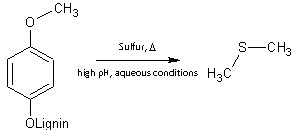
Original Gaylord DMS process: 1961-2010

The old Gaylord plant received a portion of the Kraft black liquor generated by the Temple Inland paper mill, which was used as a sulfur alkylating agent to make DMS. The crude dimethyl sulfide product was purified by distillation and could then be used to produce DMSO.

When Gaylord closed its Bogalusa plant in 2010, it changed its process technology to manufacture DMS from methanol and hydrogen sulfide gas via gas phase thioetherification. This is the dominant method used worldwide to make DMS and there are no longer any producers practicing the original lignin-based process. An interesting footnote is the naturopathic belief that DMSO derived from "natural" raw materials (i.e. lignin obtained from pine trees) has unusual medicinal properties relative to petrochemically derived DMSO. There would seem to be no scientific evidence to substantiate these claims.

DMSO produced by the discontinued lignin-based process can be distinguished analytically from petrochemically produced DMSO (using methanol/hydrogen sulfide) using high resolution mass spectroscopy (HRMS). This is due to the higher abundance of ^{14}C isotopes present in lignin-derived DMS.

== 2010 Plant Relocation and Modern Operations ==
In 2010 Gaylord Chemical Company built a new DMSO production facility in Tuscaloosa, AL. The new plant was constructed approximately 400 km away from the original Bogalusa location. The company built new infrastructure in Tuscaloosa, then dismantled, transported, and reinstalled key equipment in approximately 100 days.

The rationale provided for the plant relocation included Gaylord's inability to expand its production capacity at the Bogalusa location due to raw material restrictions. Additionally, the long term availability of sour gas provided by a nearby refinery allowed the company to implement the established H_{2}S / methanol process.

Gaylord Chemical Company's Tuscaloosa facility is ISO 9000:2008 certified and its products are compliant with the Registration, Evaluation, Authorization and Restriction of Chemicals (REACH) regulations established in the European Union under Regulation (EC) No 1907/2006. The company maintains both Kosher and Halal certificates for its facility, due in part to the use of dimethyl sulfide (DMS) as a food and flavoring ingredient.
