= Guaranty Bank (Texas) =

Defunct bank that operated in Texas and California

Guaranty Financial Group Inc.
- Predecessor: Temple-Inland
- Founded: 1938; 88 years ago as Guaranty Building and Loan in Galveston, Texas
- Defunct: 2009; 17 years ago
- Fate: Acquired by BBVA Compass in 2009 after bank failure
- Successor: BBVA Compass
- Headquarters: Austin, Texas, U.S.
- Number of locations: 162 (2009)
- Area served: Texas and California
- Key people: Kenneth R. Dubuque (1998–2008) (chairman and CEO); John T. Stuart III (2008–2009) (interim chairman and interim CEO); Kevin J. Hanigan (2008–2009) (president and COO)

Guaranty Bank was a major bank based in Austin, which collapsed in 2009. It was formed in 1988 as part of Temple-Inland and in 2007 became a standalone company. At the time of its collapse, Guaranty was the second largest bank in Texas, with 162 branches across Texas and California, and had $13 billion in assets and held $12 billion in deposits. Major shareholders included billionaire investor Carl Icahn and hotel tycoon Robert Rowling, who jointly invested $600 million in the bank in 2008.

== History ==
Guaranty Bank's origins date to 1938, when a charter was issued to the Guaranty Building and Loan in Galveston, Texas which operated as the Guaranty Federal Savings and Loan Association. In 1988, Temple-Inland formed Guaranty by acquiring three financial institutions: Guaranty Federal Savings and Loan Association, Delta Savings Association and First Federal Savings and Loan. It expanded from Texas into California in the 1990s, acquiring Stockton Savings Bank and Hemet Federal Savings & Loan.

In November 2007, Temple-Inland announced that it planned to separate itself into three stand-alone public companies. Shareholders in the original company would eventually receive stock in all three companies depending on the amount owned on the day the company split-up. The three companies were:

- Temple-Inland Inc.
- Guaranty Financial Group Inc.
- Forestar Real Estate Group Inc.

Guaranty Financial Group Inc. became a standalone financial services holding company that operated in various business segments through its primary operating subsidiaries, "Guaranty Bank" and "Guaranty Insurance Services, Inc." Guaranty Bank became a federally chartered savings bank with total assets in excess of $16 billion (consolidated) that conducted consumer and business banking activities through a network of approximately 150 bank branches located in Texas and California that provided commercial banking products and services to various geographic markets throughout the United States. Guaranty Insurance Services, Inc. became an insurance agency that focused on property and casualty insurance with fixed annuities and operated out of 17 offices located in Texas and California, as well as through branches of Guaranty Bank. Also in November

In November 2008, Kenneth R. Dubuque resigned as president and chief executive officer of the company and the bank, positions he had served in beginning in 1998 and continuing through November 18, 2008. John T. Stuart III, a director of the company and the bank, was appointed as interim chief executive officer and interim chairman of the board of the company. Also in November 2008, the company appointed Kevin J. Hanigan, previously a senior executive vice president and chief banking officer of the company and the bank, to fill the role of president and chief operating officer of the company and the bank.

== Collapse ==
As a thrift bank, its charter required it to keep 70% of its assets in housing-related investments, leaving it exposed to the 2008 US housing crash

In April 2009, the Office of Thrift Supervision ordered the bank to take a $1.5 billion writedown on the value of the mortgage-backed securities it held. This in turn left the bank with an inadequate Tier 1 capital ratio, with the bank issuing a statement saying that it was likely to be too undercapitalized to continue as a going concern. The bank's share price collapsed from $18.50 to less than 15 cents.

The Federal Deposit Insurance Corporation assumed control of the failed bank August 21, 2009. This was the 10th largest bank failure in US history, and the second largest of the 140 bank collapses of 2009 (behind Colonial Bank).

The FDIC immediately sold the assets of the bank to BBVA Compass, the US-based subsidiary of Banco Bilbao Vizcaya Argentaria (BBVA), the second biggest bank in Spain. This was the first deal between the FDIC and an institution bank tied to a foreign bank for almost 20 years. Under the agreement, the FDIC and BBVA Compass shared the losses of the bank, with the costs to the FDIC's Deposit Insurance Fund estimated to be $3 billion. Guaranty Bank was absorbed into its new parent company, with its branches being rebranded as BBVA Compass outlets.

== See also ==
- Temple-Inland
- BBVA Compass
