= One Bush Plaza =

Office building in San Francisco

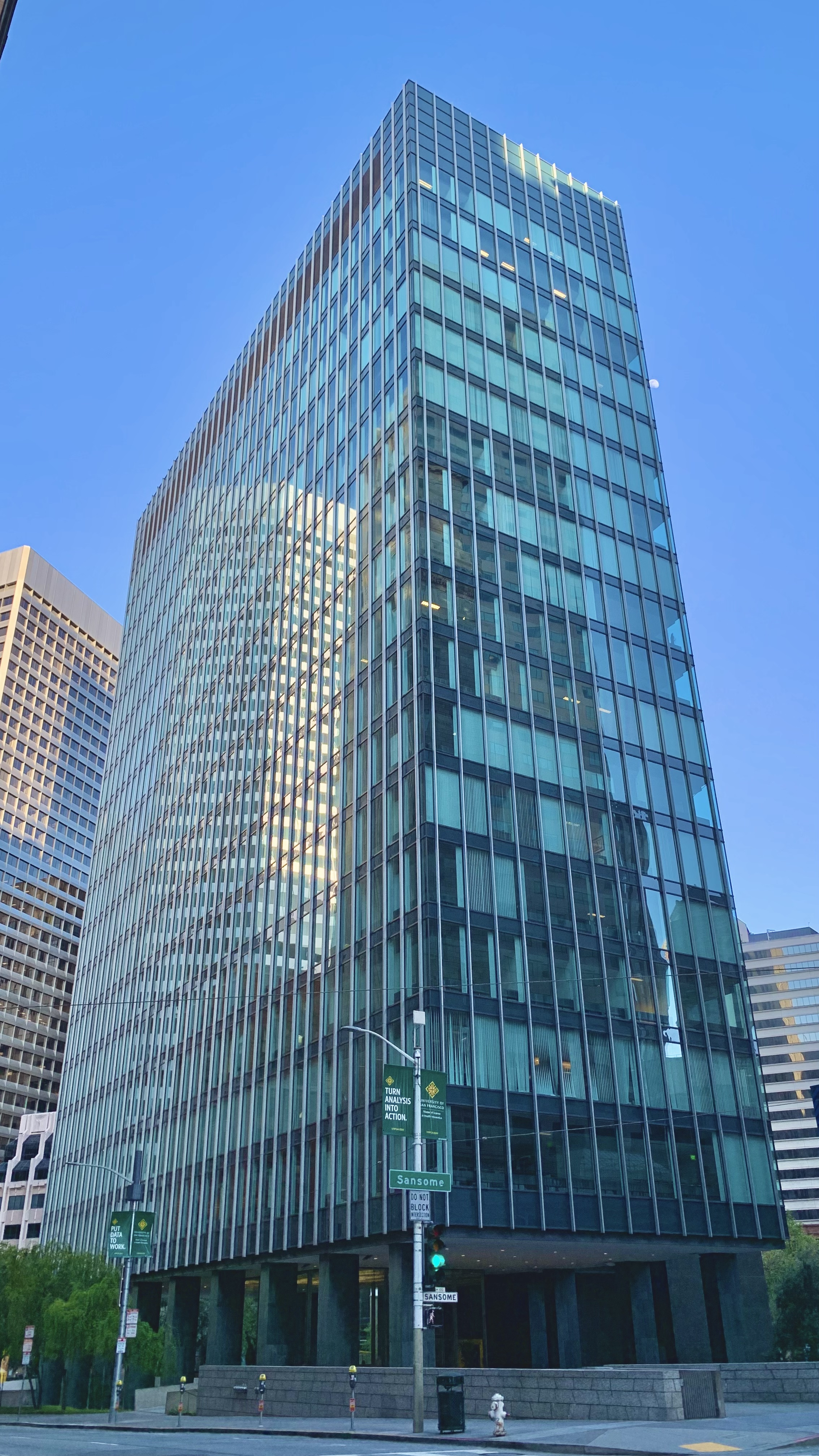
- In 2021

- Location within San Francisco County One Bush Plaza (California) One Bush Plaza (the United States)
- Alternative names: Crown Zellerbach Building

General information
- Type: Commercial offices
- Location: 1 Bush Street; San Francisco, California
- Coordinates: 37.791°N 122.4°W
- Completed: 1959, 67 years ago
- Owner: Tishman Speyer

Height
- Roof: 308 ft (94 m)

Technical details
- Floor count: 20
- Floor area: 439,000 sq ft (40,800 m^{2})

Design and construction
- Architects: Skidmore, Owings & Merrill; Hertzka & Knowles
- Structural engineer: H.J. Brunnier Associates

San Francisco Designated Landmark
- Designated: 1987
- Reference no.: 183

One Bush Plaza, also known as the Crown Zellerbach Building, is an office building in San Francisco, California, United States. Located on Bush Street and Battery Street at Market Street in the Financial District, the 20-story, 308-foot (94 m) building was completed in 1959.

== History ==
The building was originally the headquarters of Crown Zellerbach, a Fortune 500 forest products conglomerate acquired by Sir James Goldsmith in a 1985 hostile takeover. The majority of the pulp and paper assets were sold to James River in 1986, which in turn became a part of Georgia-Pacific in 2000. (The brown paper container division became Gaylord Container). James River's headquarters were in Richmond, Virginia, and Gaylord's moved to suburban Chicago. The building was later the headquarters of the investment bank Hambrecht & Quist.

Constructed in the late 1950s, it was the first significant structure erected in downtown San Francisco in the thirty years following the start of the Great Depression. It was the first International Style building in San Francisco and one of the first such buildings in the U.S., being completed shortly after the Lever House and the Seagram Building, both in New York City. It was not, however, the first building in San Francisco to feature a glass curtain wall, that designation belonging to the Hallidie Building, two blocks to the west.

One Bush Plaza was controversial due to the decision for it to face Bush Street instead of Market Street, the latter being in decline at the time of the building's construction. The building is notable for taking up an entire city block and being freestanding. It directly faces an Art Deco skyscraper, the Shell Building.

The architectural firm of Skidmore, Owings & Merrill designed One Bush Plaza.

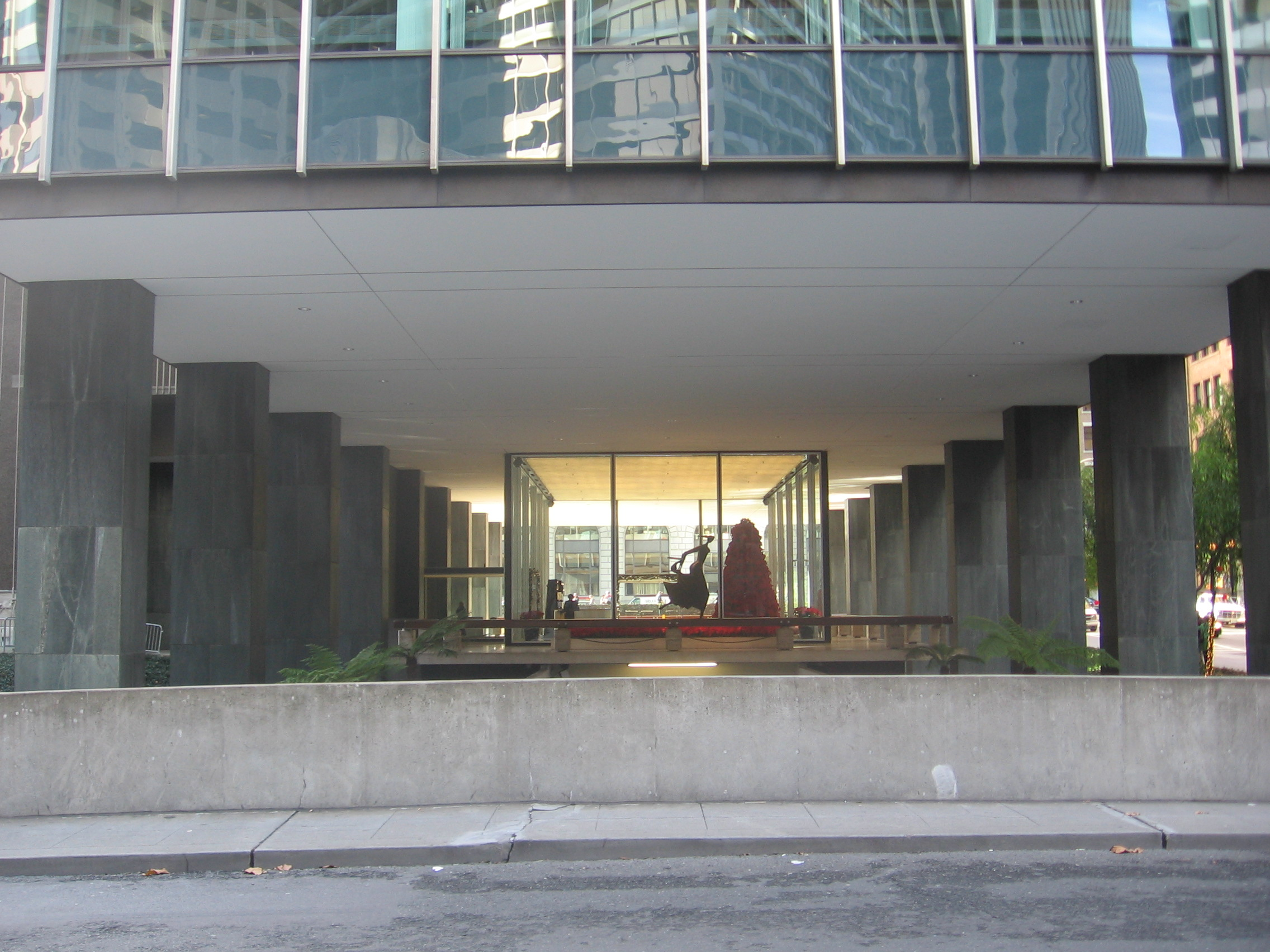
Tower base

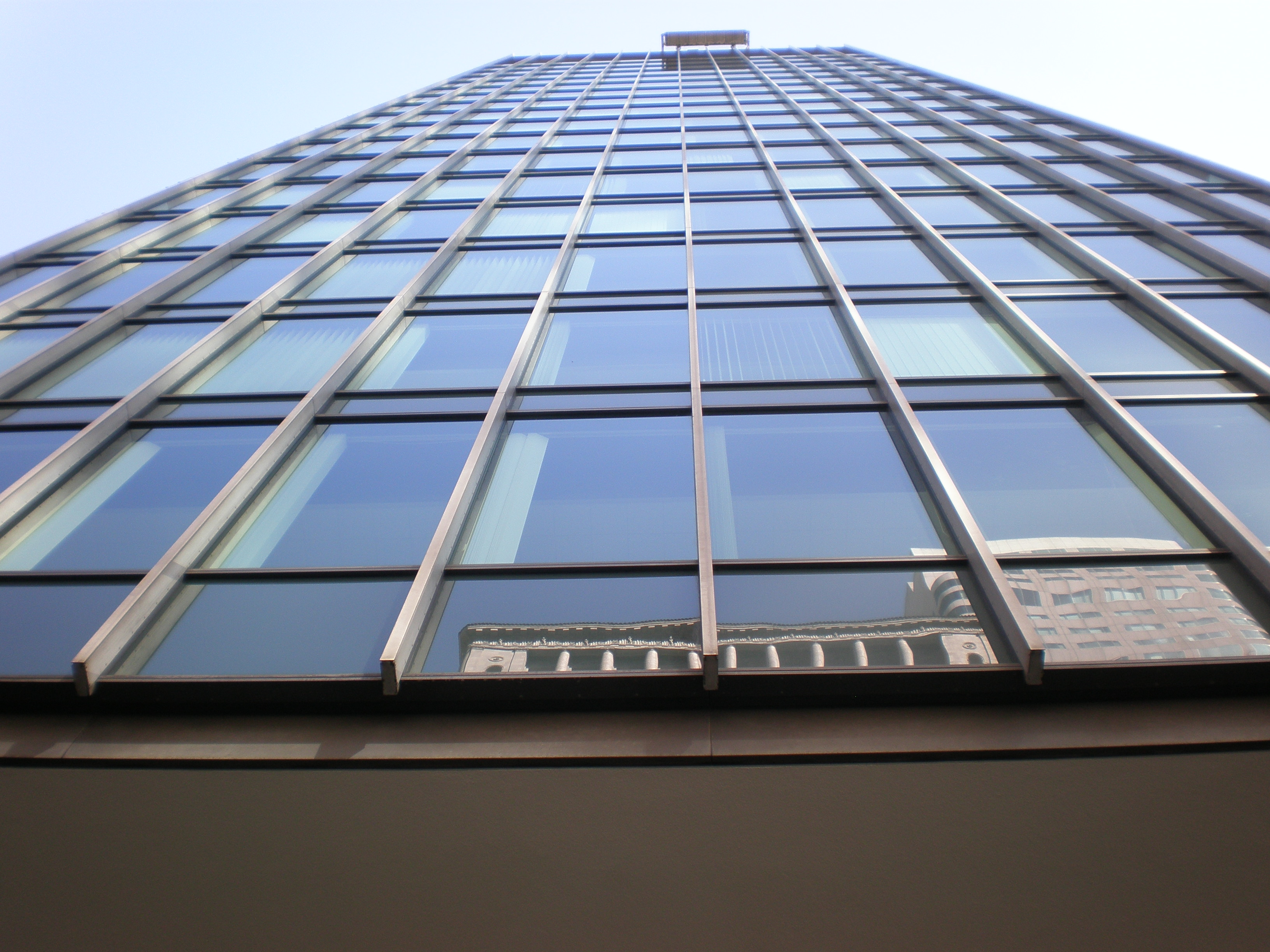

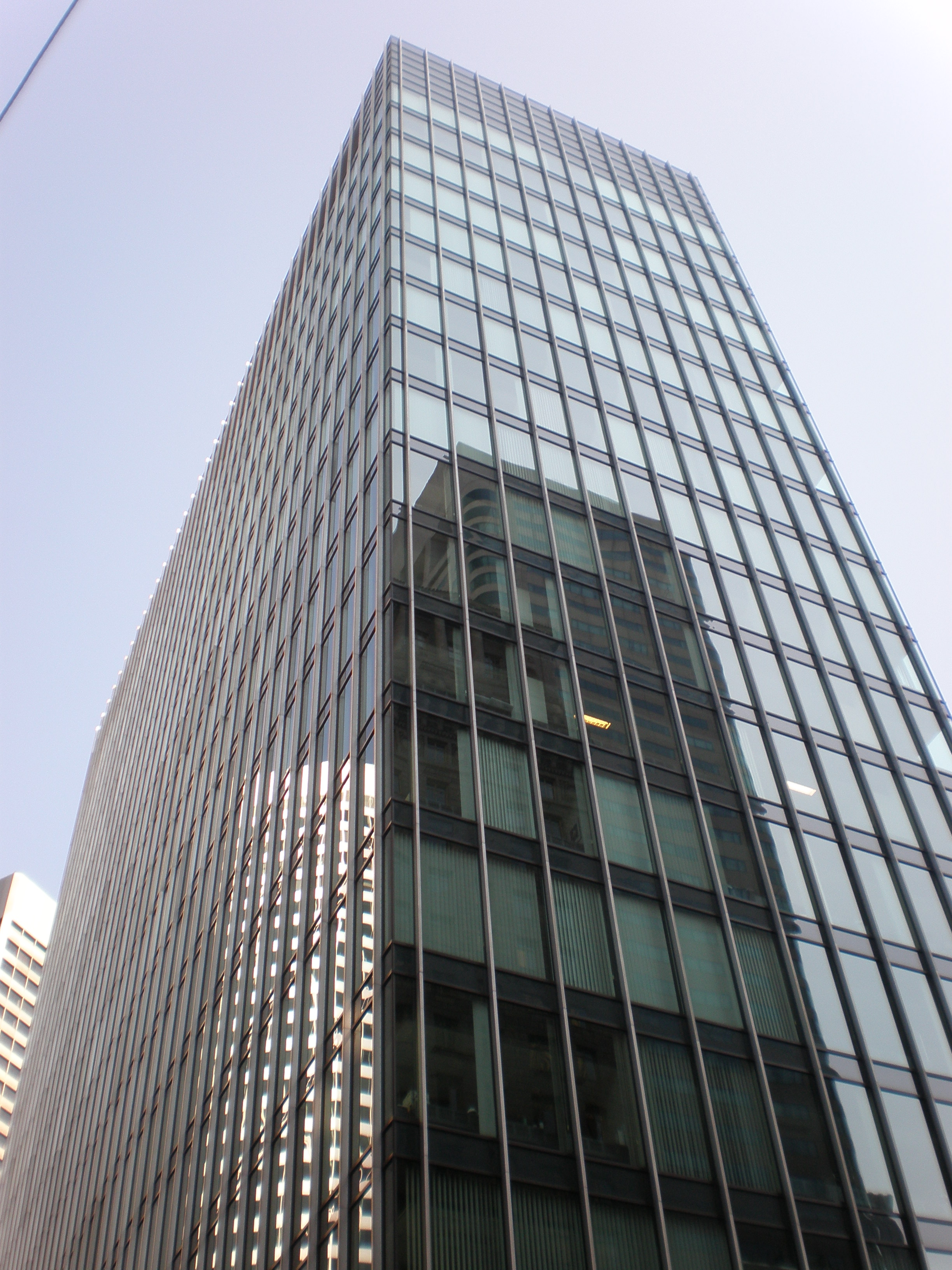

== Awards ==
- 1959 Administrative Management Magazine – Office of the Year Award: Award of Merit
- 1960 American Institute of Steel Construction – Award of Excellence
- 1961 American Institute of Architects – Award of Merit
- 1997 American Institute of Architects - California Council 25 Year Award

== See also ==
- List of tallest buildings in San Francisco
- List of San Francisco Designated Landmarks
