= Grizzly Creek Redwoods State Park =

State park of California, United States

- Location within California Location within the United States
- Location: Humboldt County, California, United States
- Nearest city: Carlotta, California
- Coordinates: 40°29′7″N 123°54′22″W
- Area: 430 acres (170 ha)
- Established: 1943
- Governing body: California Department of Parks and Recreation

Grizzly Creek Redwoods State Park is a state park of California, United States, harboring groves of coast redwoods in three separate units along the Van Duzen River. It is located 20 miles (32 km) south of Eureka, California, then another 17 miles (27 km) east of Fortuna on State Route 36. The small park was created by a donation from Owen R. Cheatham, founder of Georgia-Pacific Corporation, who wanted to preserve the stand of redwoods in perpetuity. Originally established in 1943, the park has grown to 430 acres (170 ha). Cheatham Grove, 4 miles (6.4 km) west of the main unit, was added to the park in 1983 due to efforts of the Save the Redwoods League.

== Use ==
The park is so secluded due to its location off the major regional artery, U.S. Route 101, that on weekdays a visitor may be the only person in any one of the several groves. Cheatham Grove has a small trail about a mile long and was one of the filming sites for Return of the Jedi as the forest moon of Endor. There is also an albino redwood along the trail and the park is the location of a Redwood Edventure Quest.

== Climate ==
According to the Köppen Climate Classification system, Grizzly Creek Redwoods State Park has a warm-summer mediterranean climate, abbreviated "Csb" on climate maps.

Climate data for Grizzly Creek Redwoods State Park, 1991–2020 normals, extremes 1979–2001
Month	Jan	Feb	Mar	Apr	May	Jun	Jul	Aug	Sep	Oct	Nov	Dec	Year
Record high °F (°C)	65 (18)	69 (21)	71 (22)	81 (27)	92 (33)	92 (33)	95 (35)	93 (34)	89 (32)	91 (33)	67 (19)	64 (18)	95 (35)
Mean maximum °F (°C)	57.8 (14.3)	61.7 (16.5)	65.2 (18.4)	75.4 (24.1)	81.0 (27.2)	81.4 (27.4)	83.9 (28.8)	84.2 (29.0)	82.0 (27.8)	76.5 (24.7)	62.0 (16.7)	56.7 (13.7)	88.4 (31.3)
Mean daily maximum °F (°C)	49.6 (9.8)	52.3 (11.3)	55.1 (12.8)	59.6 (15.3)	64.9 (18.3)	68.8 (20.4)	73.2 (22.9)	73.3 (22.9)	71.9 (22.2)	62.7 (17.1)	53.9 (12.2)	48.5 (9.2)	61.2 (16.2)
Daily mean °F (°C)	43.9 (6.6)	45.5 (7.5)	47.9 (8.8)	51.2 (10.7)	56.3 (13.5)	59.5 (15.3)	62.8 (17.1)	63.2 (17.3)	60.7 (15.9)	53.9 (12.2)	47.0 (8.3)	43.0 (6.1)	52.9 (11.6)
Mean daily minimum °F (°C)	38.3 (3.5)	38.8 (3.8)	40.6 (4.8)	42.8 (6.0)	47.6 (8.7)	50.3 (10.2)	52.5 (11.4)	53.0 (11.7)	49.4 (9.7)	45.0 (7.2)	40.2 (4.6)	37.6 (3.1)	44.7 (7.1)
Mean minimum °F (°C)	29.8 (−1.2)	30.7 (−0.7)	32.3 (0.2)	34.4 (1.3)	38.8 (3.8)	42.0 (5.6)	46.0 (7.8)	46.9 (8.3)	42.4 (5.8)	36.6 (2.6)	31.4 (−0.3)	28.5 (−1.9)	27.0 (−2.8)
Record low °F (°C)	23 (−5)	22 (−6)	29 (−2)	31 (−1)	33 (1)	37 (3)	41 (5)	41 (5)	37 (3)	30 (−1)	27 (−3)	16 (−9)	16 (−9)
Average precipitation inches (mm)	8.57 (218)	8.87 (225)	6.64 (169)	4.91 (125)	2.11 (54)	0.73 (19)	0.09 (2.3)	0.09 (2.3)	0.51 (13)	2.63 (67)	6.38 (162)	10.72 (272)	52.25 (1,328.6)
Average snowfall inches (cm)	0.1 (0.25)	0.1 (0.25)	0.3 (0.76)	0.0 (0.0)	0.0 (0.0)	0.0 (0.0)	0.0 (0.0)	0.0 (0.0)	0.0 (0.0)	0.0 (0.0)	0.0 (0.0)	0.2 (0.51)	0.7 (1.77)
Average precipitation days (≥ 0.01 in)	16.4	13.7	15.2	13.1	8.9	4.7	2.0	1.9	2.1	6.4	13.2	14.8	112.4
Average snowy days (≥ 0.1 in)	0.1	0.1	0.2	0.0	0.0	0.0	0.0	0.0	0.0	0.0	0.0	0.1	0.5
Source: NOAA (mean maxima/minima 1980–2000)

== Proposed for closure ==
Grizzly Creek Redwoods State Park was one of 70 California state parks proposed for closure by July 2012 as part of a deficit reduction program. It was previously one of several state parks threatened with closure in 2008. However, these closures were ultimately avoided by reducing visitor services, operational hours, and maintenance system-wide.

== See also ==
- List of California state parks
