= Weidner Center for the Performing Arts =

Performing arts center in Green Bay, Wisconsin

The Weidner
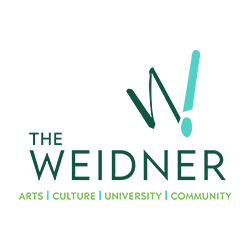
- Interactive map of The Weidner
- Address: 2420 Nicolet Drive; Green Bay, Wisconsin, U.S.
- Coordinates: 44.5330°N 87.9228°W
- Owner: University of Wisconsin–Green Bay
- Capacity: 2,021
- Type: Performing arts center
- Public transit: Green Bay Metro

Construction
- Opened: January 15, 1993

Website
- www.weidnercenter.com

Weidner Center for the Performing Arts, also known as The Weidner, WCPA, or Weidner Center is a performing arts center in Green Bay, Wisconsin, located on the University of Wisconsin–Green Bay campus. Named after the university's first chancellor, Edward W. Weidner, the venue opened January 15, 1993.

== History ==
The Weidner's original gift came from surgeon David A. Cofrin (son of Austin E. Cofrin and namesake of UW-Green Bay's library) with the stipulation that the center be located on the UW-Green Bay campu, that it serve the community, and be named after Ed Weidner. The university used state funds for the project as the original plan for UW-Green Bay's campus included a performing arts center. Namesake chancellor Weidner began a fundraising campaign in the late 1980s that raised the remainder of the $18.4 million required for the building. The university calls The Weidner a "'comm-university' center, supported by both the university and the communities of northeastern Wisconsin".

=== 1998 expansion ===
For The Weidner's fifth anniversary, donations from the Cofrin family financed an expansion that included a new black-box theatre named Studio Two, later renamed the Jean Weidner Theatre in honor of Ed Weidner's wife. The renovation also expanded the ticket office, added more lobby restrooms, expanded backstage storage and dressing room space, constructed a semi-private dining area and food service elevator, and relocated The Weidner's administrative offices.

== Facilities ==
=== Cofrin Family Hall ===
Cofrin Family Hall is The Weidner's main performance facility, seating 2,021 over three levels of seating. The capacity of Cofrin Family Hall depends on the type of performance, as The Weidner's two-section motorized thrust stage can be lowered and fitted with extra seats, typically for dramatic performances. Symphonic and other music-only performances routinely use the entire thrust. Cofrin Family Hall also contains a large pipe organ, the Wood Family Organ, built for The Weidner's acoustics. Nearly all of The Weidner's touring acts perform in Cofrin Family Hall, with eclectic programming that includes concerts, comedians, Broadway shows, children's programming, and more. UW-Green Bay holds its winter graduations in Cofrin Family Hall.

The UWGB Music department's Symphonic Band, Wind Ensemble, University Singers, and Concert Choir all perform two concerts per semester in Cofrin Family Hall, and the department's annual JazzFest takes place in Cofrin Family Hall in the spring.

The UWGB Theatre department performs in Cofrin Family Hall occasionally, putting on Cabaret in 2011. It performed another musical there in fall 2015 and participated in The Weidner's Stage Door educational theatre series in spring 2016 and 2017.

=== Fort Howard Hall ===
Fort Howard Hall, named for the Fort Howard Paper Company founded by donor Austin E. Cofrin, is a recital hall. It seats 200 in retractable theatre-style seating, and can seat 136 in a banquet-style setting. The room is used for receptions and pre-show dinners. The UWGB Music department is the most frequent academic user of the space, and holds its Student Honors Recital and several guest artist concerts and lectures there annually.

=== Studio One ===
Built in the style of a dance studio with mirrors and marley dance floor, Studio One is rarely used for its intended purpose, instead serving as a multipurpose space for The Weidner, and a reception area/backstage storage for the UWGB Theatre department when it is performing in the Jean Weidner Theatre.

=== Jean Weidner Theatre ===
Built in the 1998 renovation and originally called Studio Two, the space was renamed the Jean Weidner Theatre after Edward Weidner's wife. Jean Weidner Theatre is a black-box style theatre that seats 90 in either a standard theatre style or a theatre in the round arrangement. Although it is part of The Weidner, the UWGB Theatre department oversees the space and is its primary user. The UWGB Music department holds most of its student recitals in the space, along with its Opera/Musical Theatre workshop.

== Weidner Philharmonic ==
The Weidner Philharmonic is The Weidner's in-house symphony since 2019. Also known as "Wei Phi", the Weidner Philharmonic is the only all professional symphony orchestra in Green Bay.

Since 2021, they have partnered with Northeastern Wisconsin Dance Organization to provide live orchestration for annual The Nutcracker ballet.

Since 2022, Weidner Philharmonic has been under the artistic direction of Dr. Michelle McQuade Dewhirst. McQuade Dewhirst is a French horn player, composer, and professor of music at the University of Wisconsin-Green Bay. Weidner Philharmonic performed, Out of Dark Waters, this, a world premiere composition piece by McQuade Dewhirst at the Women's Work concert in 2022.

Weidner Philharmonic Performances
2019-2020 Concert Series	Date	Conductor(s)	Concert Program
The New World Symphony	September 28, 2019	Michael Alexander Kevin Collins Randall Meder Victor Yampolsky^	
A Symphonic Night at the Movies: Casablanca	February 22, 2020	Scott Terrell^	Film with live orchestra presentation. Score by Max Steiner.
2020-2021 Concert Series	Date	Conductor(s)	Concert Program
Walton's Façade: An Entertainment*	June 20, 2021	Randall Meder	
2021-2022 Concert Series	Date	Conductor(s)	
Welcome Once Again: Beethoven, Milhaud, Stravinsky and Montgomery	September 25, 2021	Robert Nordling^	
A Symphonic Night at the Movies: The Wizard of Oz	April 3, 2022	Scott Terrell^	Film with live orchestra presentation. Music by Harold Arlen (songs), E.Y. Harburg (lyrics), Score by Herbert Stothart.
2022-2023 Concert Series	Date	Conductor(s)	Concert Program
Women's Work	September 14, 2022	Michael Alexander Robert Nordling^	Concert program featuring the work of women composers - Clarice Assad, Stacy Garrop, Jennifer Higdon, Michelle McQuade Dewhirst.
Power & Joy	April 22, 2023	Harvey Felder^	
2023-2024 Concert Series	Date	Conductor(s)	Concert Program
Dance Dance Evolution	September 30, 2023	Michael Alexander	Concert inspired by world dance music - compositions by Alberto Ginastera, Jonathan Bailey Howard, Roberto Sierra, Gabriela Lena Frank, Maurice Ravel. Also featured a post-concert dance performance by Water Street Dance Milwaukee.
Harry Potter and the Sorcerer's Stone in Concert	February 16, 2023 February 17, 2023	Ron Spigelman^	Film with live orchestra presentation. Score by John Williams.
Bathed in Blue	April 6, 2024	Michael Alexander	Oceanic inspired concert program - compositions by Felix Mendelssohn, George Crumb, Alex Shapiro, Einojuhani Rautavaara. Also featured a post-concert dance performance by Water Street Dance Milwaukee
Beer & Ballet	May 4, 2024	Emil de Cou^	Ballet performance with live orchestration, featuring dancers from Carolina Ballet, Houston Ballet, Pacific Northwest Ballet, Philadelphia Ballet

*Virtual Performance

^Featured Guest Conductor

Unless noted, all conductors are faculty members of the University of Wisconsin-Green Bay's Resch Institute of Music.

== The Weidner Downtown at the Tarlton Theatre ==
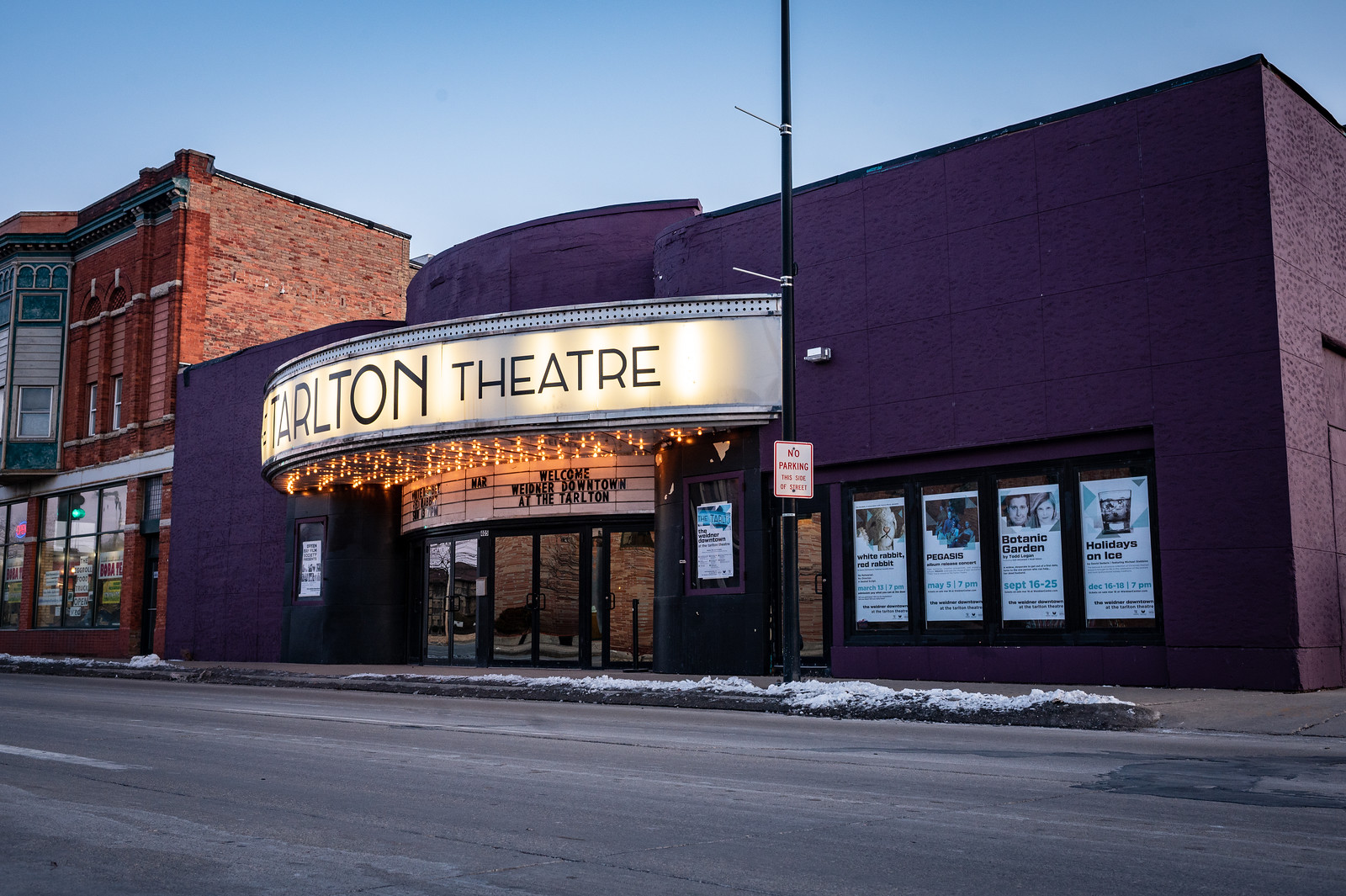
Weidner Downtown at the Tarlton Theatre

In February 2022 The Weidner, in partnership with the Tarlton Theatre, announced The Weidner Downtown at the Tarlton Theatre series, also shortened to The Weidner Downtown. The series aims to bring an eclectic mix of arts and culture including chamber theatre, film, live lit, music, and more to downtown Green Bay at The Tarlton Theatre.

The partnership was announced to continue into 2023.

== Notable performers ==
- Aaron Neville
- Alton Brown
- Andy Grammer
- Ann Margaret
- Anne Murray
- Anthony Bourdain
- B. B. King
- Bernadette Peters
- Beverly Sills
- Bill Cosby
- Bob Newhart
- Bonnie Raitt
- Bryan Adams
- Cathy Rigby
- Colin Mochrie
- Dionne Warwick
- Frankie Valli
- Gabriel Iglesias
- George Carlin
- Glen Campbell
- Goo Goo Dolls
- Hal Holbrook
- Iliza Shlesinger
- Itzhak Perlman
- James Taylor
- Jerry Seinfeld
- Jimmy Fallon
- Joe Bonamassa
- John Cleese
- John Denver
- John Mellencamp
- Johnny Cash
- Judy Collins
- Kathy Griffin
- Kenny G
- Kenny Rogers
- Lewis Black
- Lily Tomlin
- Lisa Lampanelli
- Loretta Swit
- Mandy Patinkin
- Marie Osmond
- Martin Short
- Paula Poundstone
- Peabo Bryson
- Penn & Teller
- Ralph Macchio
- Randy Travis
- Rick Springfield
- Rita Rudner
- Robert Goulet
- Sebastian Maniscalco
- Shari Lewis
- Tim Conway
- Tony Bennett
- Tony Curtis
- Vince Gill
- Willie Nelson

== Notable speakers ==
- Anna Quindlen
- Bernie Sanders
- David Axelrod
- Doris Kearns Goodwin
- Gregory Peck
- Jane Pauley
- Jeannette Walls
- Joan Rivers
- Julie Andrews
- Karl Rove
- Kobie Boykins
- Madeleine Albright
- Marianne Pearl
- Marlee Matlin
- Maya Angelou
- Michael Moore
- Mitch Albom
- Michael Beschloss
- Star Jones

== Notable performances and shows ==
- 42nd Street
- Aida
- American Indian Dance Theatre
- Annie
- The Best Little Whorehouse in Texas
- Blue Man Group
- Blue's Clues Live!
- Cabaret
- Camelot
- Celtic Women the Emerald Tour
- Cirque Mechanics Pedal Punk
- A Charlie Brown Christmas Live on Stage
- Chicago
- A Chorus Line
- Dial M for Murder
- Disenchanted!
- Dr. Seuss' How the Grinch Stole Christmas! The Musical
- Fiddler on the Roof
- Finding Neverland
- Fosse
- Grease
- Mark Twain Tonight
- How to Succeed in Business Without Really Trying
- I Love Lucy Live on Stage
- It's a Wonderful Life a Live Radio Play
- Jekyll & Hyde
- Jersey Boys
- Joseph and the Amazing Technicolor Dreamcoat
- Legally Blonde the Musical
- Man of la Mancha
- Les Misérables
- Monty Python's Spamalot
- Moulin Rouge the Ballet
- The Music Man
- Once
- Pippin
- The Phantom of the Opera
- Rain: A Tribute to the Beatles
- Rent
- Riders in the Sky
- Riverdance
- Rock of Ages
- Rodgers and Hammerstein's Cinderella
- Saturday Night Fever
- Say Goodnight Gracie
- The Scarlet Pimpernel
- Shrek the Musical
- The Simon & Garfunkel Story
- Sister Act
- Some Like It Hot
- The Sound of Music
- Stomp!
- The Ten Tenors
- Titanic a New Musical
- Thoroughly Modern Millie
- Whose Live Anyway?
- West Side Story

== Artwork ==
=== Josephine B. Lenfestey Chandelier ===
The Weidner installed the Josephine B. Lenfestey Chandelier created by Dale Chihuly in the summer of 2004. The chandelier has more than 450 individual pieces of blown glass and is 12 by 8 feet. The installation took 3 days in June and had a public unveiling on September 12, 2004.

== See also ==
- List of concert halls
