= Nachawati Law Group =

American law firm

- Headquarters: Dallas, Texas
- Date founded: 2006
- Website: ntrial.com

Nachawati Law Group is an American law firm headquartered in Dallas. It is best known for representing states, counties, cities, and other public entities in lawsuits against opioid pharmaceutical makers, chain pharmacies, and distributors for damages caused by the manufacture, distribution, and sales of prescription opioid painkillers. The firm has represented the states of Oklahoma and Utah as well as the city of Albuquerque in opioid litigation against Purdue Pharma, and was part of a $270 million settlement to build a National Center for Addiction Studies and Treatment at Oklahoma State University.

Founded in 2006, Nachawati Law Group is active in mass tort and multidistrict litigation on behalf of individuals and public entities.

== Litigation ==
The firm represents the state of Nevada in litigation against TikTok, Snapchat and Meta (which owns Facebook, Instagram and WhatsApp) over claims that the sites's use of algorithms that encourage problematic internet usage by young people that negatively affects their mental health, as well as body image, physical health, privacy and safety. Among the concerns are the sites' use of endless scrolling, "dopamine-inducing" rewards and disappearing content alleged to manipulate young users and get them addicted to online platforms. In 2023, the firm was hired by the state of Mississippi to pursue a lawsuit against Meta arising from the harm inflicted on Mississippi children and young adults arising from the use of Meta's social media platforms.

The firm represents more than 5,000 women over claims that they were diagnosed with cancer after exposure to asbestos-contaminated talcum powder manufactured by Johnson & Johnson. Nachawati was involved in settlement negotiations as part of three separate bankruptcy plans by Johnson & Johnson using a Texas bankruptcy law known as the Texas Two-Step, each of them unsuccessful. Following the third dismissal, the firm indicated it would seek an aggressive trial schedule in courts across the country. The firm recruited and represented plaintiffs in multidistrict litigation regarding claims that the heart burn drug ranitidine causes cancer. The firm represents more than 6,000 individuals diagnosed with Non-Hodgkins Lymphoma following exposure to Monsanto's Roundup herbicide. Nachawati was critical of a $2 billion settlement proposed by Monsanto in 2021, which was later rejected by the judge presiding over the cases.

The firm represents about 5,000 individuals seeking damages for injuries from power outages caused by Winter Storm Uri in February 2021, including more than 100 wrongful death claims. The lawsuits are against energy companies, insurance companies, and the Electric Reliability Council of Texas, the state's grid manager. Those lawsuits are consolidated in multidistrict litigation in Harris County, Texas, court. In June 2024, Nachawati Law Group appellate lawyers obtained what observers described as a key appellate court ruling that allowed allegations of gross negligence and intentional misconduct to move forward against defendants known as transmission and distribution utilities (TDUs) that include CenterPoint Energy, Oncore Electric Delivery and American Electric Power.

The firm represents customers in litigation against ADT Pulse home security systems. Plaintiffs claim that ADT was negligent in allowing an employee to access their home networks and spy on customers over a seven-year period. Investigators said the employee, identified as Telesforo Aviles, used a security loophole to give himself permission to access customer accounts. The loophole was inadvertently discovered when a customer found an unauthorized email among the addresses given permission to access their security system. ADT is accused of breach of contract, negligence, intrusion upon seclusion, Computer Fraud and Abuse Act violations, negligence, and intentional infliction of emotional distress. Days after the 2025 Los Angeles wildfires, Nachawati Law Group held a series of town hall meetings for survivors to provide information about legal issues and resources to rebuild, including the potential liability of Southern California Edison. The firm was one of the first to file a lawsuit on behalf of survivors, seeking damages from Southern California Edison for actions and inactions that caused the Eaton fire.

The firm represents survivors and family members of those killed in the 2019 mass shooting at the Cielo Vista Walmart in El Paso. The plaintiffs claim that Walmart did not provide adequate security despite several incidents of violent crime at other stores.

The firm has paid for television advertisements seeking clients to pursue child abuse lawsuits against the Catholic Church.

The firm represents state, regional and local governments in litigation, including the states of Arkansas, Nebraska, Arizona, and Kentucky in litigation against the e-commerce app Temu. The lawsuit claims that the app's Chinese-owned parent company PDD Holdings operates in violation of the state's deceptive trade practices law by overriding the privacy settings of users' phones and collecting more data than is necessary.

The firm represented the owner of a Tesla Model X whose car was vandalized in an incident attributed to the Tesla Takedown movement. The firm filed the first-known civil lawsuit against a suspect in such a case, and the lawsuit sought more than $1 million in damages.

The firm represents the state of New Jersey in antitrust litigation claiming that Amazon unlawfully limits competition among delivery drivers by package delivery services and exerts unlawful control over drivers by discouraging drivers from forming labor unions, resulting in lower wages and "grueling and inhumane" working conditions.
