= 2018 Taylorsville Georgia-Pacific strike =

- Date: March 28 – April 16, 2018 (2 weeks and 5 days)
- Location: Taylorsville, Mississippi, United States

Parties
United Brotherhood of Carpenters and Joiners of America Local 2086	Georgia-Pacific

The 2018 Taylorsville Georgia-Pacific strike was a labor strike involving workers for Georgia-Pacific in Taylorsville, Mississippi, United States.

The strike began on March 28, 2018 at 11 p.m. The strikers were members of the Carpenters Industrial Council Local 2086, the local union for the United Brotherhood of Carpenters and Joiners of America. The cause for the strike was related to scheduling issues, with a representative from the union telling WDAM-TV that "employees are unable to schedule vacations or know when they aren't scheduled to work." At the time, negotiations had been ongoing for almost a year, with union membership previously voting to reject the company's proposals in both December and January. According to a press release issued by the union, the rejections were due to "severe lack of information throughout the company's proposal". An official from the company stated that the negotiations were intended to lead to a schedule that was "more equitable to all the employees."

The strike, which lasted over two weeks, ended on April 16, with the strikers returning to work that day. Union and company representatives had previously undergone mediation on April 13, without success. A company representative stated that union members had voted to ratify their labor contracts and return to work, with a union representative claiming that the time limit for the strike was approaching and that prolonging the strike would have allowed the company to "close their doors on us."
