= Crown Zellerbach =

Defunct American pulp and paper conglomerate

Crown Zellerbach Corporation
- Final logo, used from 1970

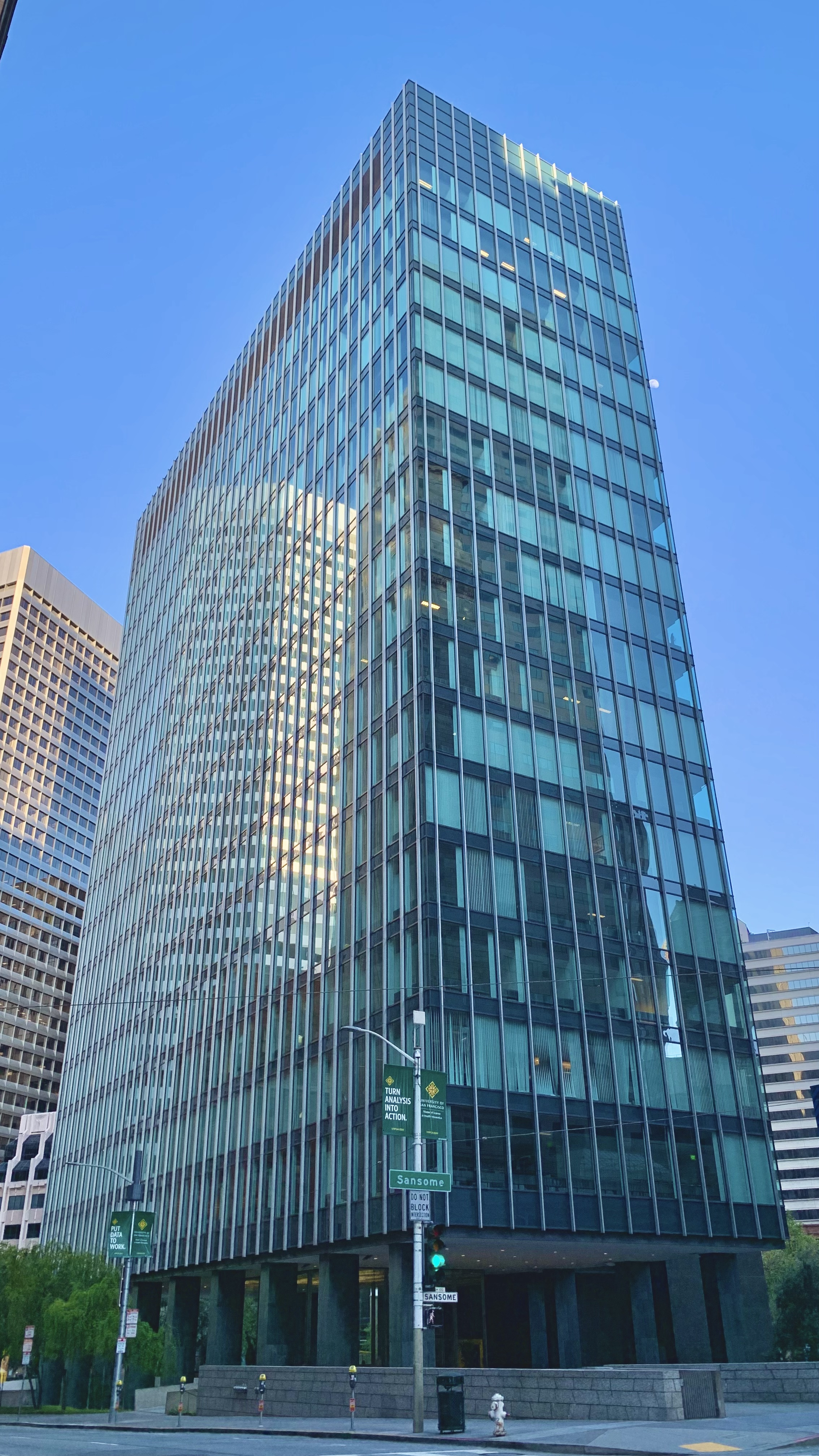
- Former headquarters in San Francisco, today known as One Bush Plaza
- Type: Public
- Traded as: NYSE: ZB (until 1985)
- Industry: Pulp and paper, forest products
- Predecessor: Crown Willamette Paper Company; Zellerbach Paper Company
- Founded: September 1, 1928; 98 years ago, in San Francisco, California, U.S.
- Defunct: December 1985; 40 years ago
- Fate: Dismantled after hostile takeover
- Headquarters: Crown Zellerbach Building, San Francisco, California, United States

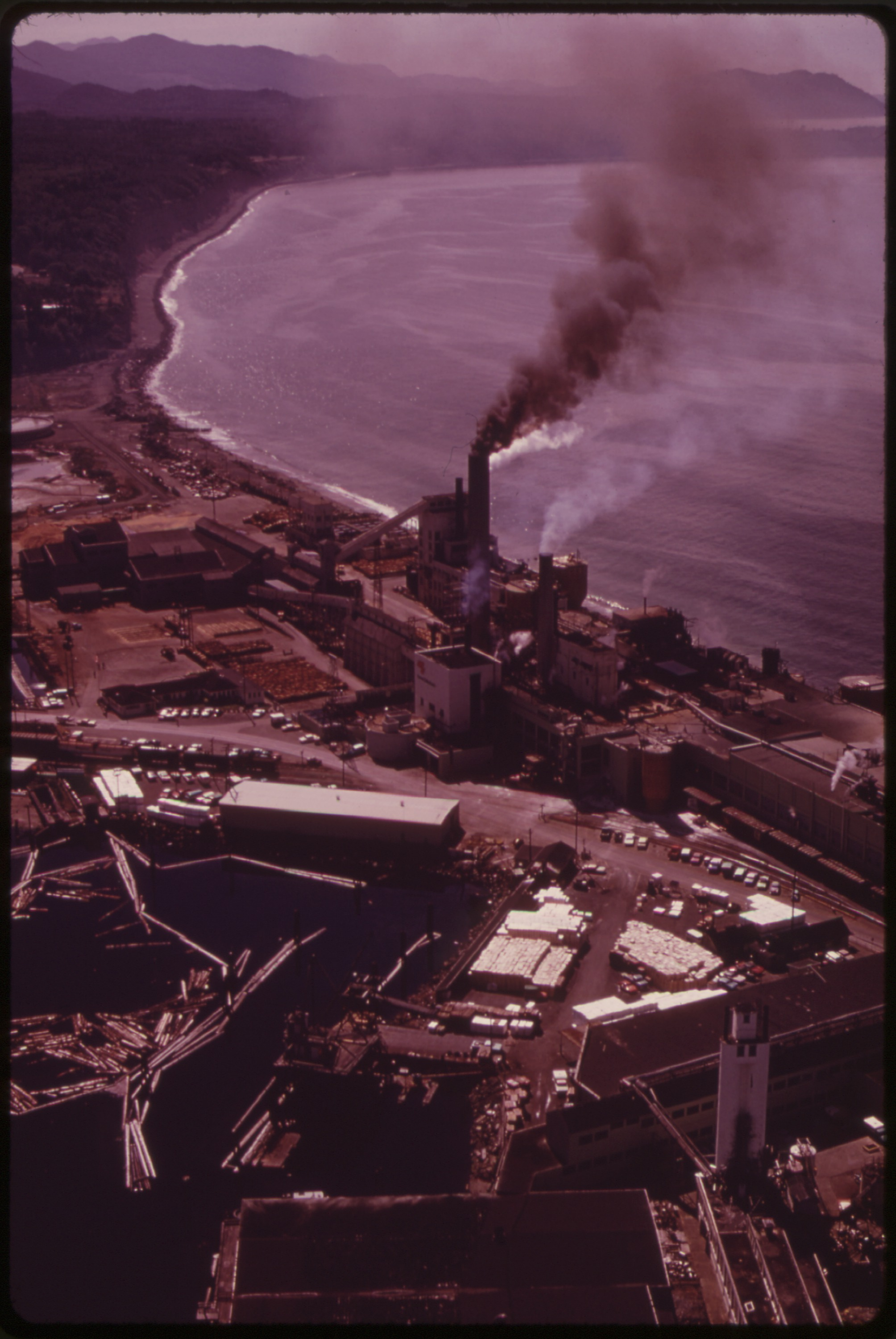
The Port Angeles Paper Mill (owned and operated by Crown Zellerbach in 1973)

Crown Zellerbach was an American pulp and paper conglomerate based in San Francisco, California, purchased in a hostile takeover in 1985. Most of its pulp and paper assets were sold to James River Corporation, now part of Georgia-Pacific.

Its name lives on through the Crown Zellerbach Building in San Francisco (One Bush Plaza) and various philanthropic projects of the Zellerbach family. The company invented folded paper towels, molded pulp egg cartons, and the window envelope.

== History ==
Anthony Zellerbach was born to a Jewish family in 1832 in Bavaria, Germany. He emigrated to America in 1846, first to Philadelphia, then San Francisco, and to Moores Flat, California, in 1856. With his son Jacob, he founded the Zellerbach Paper Company in San Francisco in 1882. Another son, Isador, later joined the company, and it changed its name to A. Zellerbach and Sons, and another son Henry joined in 1896, but the firm changed its name back to the Zellerbach Paper company in 1907.

The company invented folded paper towels commonly found in public washrooms whereby pulling one paper towel out from the bottom of a stack leaves the whole stack intact. The company also invented molded pulp egg cartons and the window envelope, which was first used by the billing unit of San Francisco-based Pacific Gas and Electric Company (PG&E).

In 1928, the Zellerbach Paper Company merged with the Crown Willamette Paper Company to form publicly traded Crown Zellerbach Corp. The company had assets of nearly $100 million, over 350,000 acres of timberland, and paper mills throughout the Pacific Coast capable of producing 1450 tons of finished paper daily. It expanded steadily throughout the 1930s and substantially during the second world war when European paper manufacturers no longer exported to the United States. In 1947 it started producing coated paper for Time Life Magazine.

It eventually started expanding through acquisitions of the Canadian Western Lumber Company and St. Helens Pulp and Paper. In 1952, it was the second largest landholder in the American West after Weyerhaeuser. In 1958, it became the subject of a U.S. Justice Department antitrust suit due to its market position and was forced to undo some of its acquisitions.

In the 1960s and 1970s, the corporation diversified and expanded its reach internationally - a common tactic at the time. This exposed the company to markets experiencing significant competition, but also diversified its products to include timber and plastics. Because of the years it acquired its landholdings, the carrying value of its vast timberland on its balance sheet was significantly lower than the timberland's market value. Moreover, new environmental and other land use restrictions made it difficult for other companies to assemble such a portfolio of land, but the market was not fully aware of the new litigation environment. This led to a significantly undervalued stock price.

In the late 1970s, Paul Bilzerian worked in the treasurer's office of Crown Zellerbach, assessing merger opportunities.

In late 1984, Crown Zellerbach became the focus of a hostile takeover by British financier Sir James Goldsmith, who gained control of the company in July 1985 and became its chairman. The last chief executive of the company was William T. Creson (1929–1998), who relinquished the chairmanship to Goldsmith. Creson had succeeded C. Raymond Dahl as CEO and chairman in October 1981.

It was widely speculated that Goldsmith wanted to buy the company for its undervalued land holdings. Goldsmith spun off three business areas into companies that he would control: the timberlands and wood products (Cavenham Forest Industries), the brown paper container business (Gaylord Container Ltd.) and computer supply company Eczel Corporation. In December 1985, Goldsmith agreed to sell the remainder of Crown Zellerbach with majority of the pulp and paper business to the James River Corporation.

Goldsmith sold Cavenham Forest Industries to Hanson in 1990 in exchange for a stake in Newmont Mining. Willamette Industries acquired Cavenham from Hanson in 1996.

Gaylord Container Limited was sold in October 1986 and became Gaylord Container Corporation; it was purchased in 2002 by Temple-Inland, which was acquired by International Paper a decade later.
