= Georgia-Pacific Tower =

Skyscraper in Atlanta, Georgia

Georgia-Pacific Center

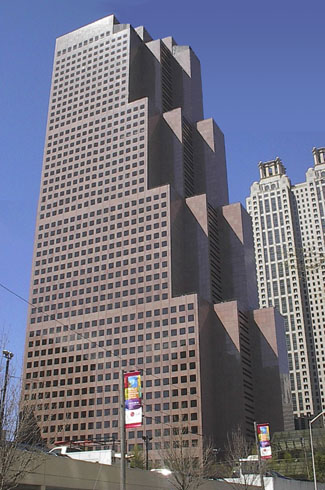
- Georgia-Pacific Center in 2004

General information
- Status: Completed
- Type: Office
- Location: 133 Peachtree Street NE; Atlanta, Georgia, United States
- Coordinates: 33.7577°N 84.3875°W
- Construction started: 1979
- Completed: 1982

Height
- Roof: 212.45 m (697.0 ft)

Technical details
- Floor count: 52

Design and construction
- Architect: Skidmore, Owings & Merrill

Website
- georgia-pacificcenter.com

Georgia-Pacific Center is a 212.45 m (697.0 ft), 1,567,011 sq.ft skyscraper in downtown Atlanta, Georgia, United States. It contains 52 stories of office space and was finished in 1982. Before the six-year era of tall skyscrapers to be built in Atlanta, it was Atlanta's second-tallest building (only surpassed by the Westin Peachtree Plaza Hotel) from 1982 to 1987. It has a stair-like design that staggers down to the ground, and is clad in pink granite quarried from Marble Falls, Texas.

The tower is on the former site of the Loew's Grand Theatre, where the premiere for the 1939 film Gone with the Wind was held (133 Peachtree St. NE, near the intersection of Peachtree and Forsyth streets). The theatre could not be demolished because of its landmark status; it burned down in 1978, clearing the way for the tower.

The architectural firm that designed it was Skidmore, Owings & Merrill. The general contractor who constructed the project was a joint venture of J.A. Jones Construction Company's Atlanta office and the H.J. Russell Company, also of Atlanta. The tower is the world headquarters of Georgia-Pacific. Other tenants include consulting firm McKinsey & Company and the downtown branch of the High Museum of Art, which opened in 1986.

On March 14, 2008, the tower sustained minor damage when a tornado tore through downtown Atlanta. A number of windows were blown out. It was the first tornado to hit the downtown area since weather record keeping began in the 1880s.

In September 2024, Georgia-Pacific unveiled plans to redevelop the building for mixed use, citing the changing office landscape as well as addressing the demand for additional residential and retail space in Downtown Atlanta. The uppermost floors of the tower were planned to be converted into 400 apartment units, with 125,000 sq ft (11,600 m^{2}) of retail, entertainment, and restaurant space as well as a 35,000 sq ft (3,300 m^{2}) outdoor plaza at the building's base, and 600,000 sq ft (56,000 m^{2}) of Class-A office space. The renovation of tower was expected to be completed by the fall of 2027. However, in early September 2026, the redevelopment plans for the tower were cancelled, citing market headwinds and high construction costs.

The Consulate-General of the United Kingdom is located in the building. The building served as a filming location for the 1985 action film Invasion U.S.A. starring Chuck Norris and Richard Lynch, in which it served as the setting for the final battle between the United States Army and Soviet/Cuban-led guerrillas.

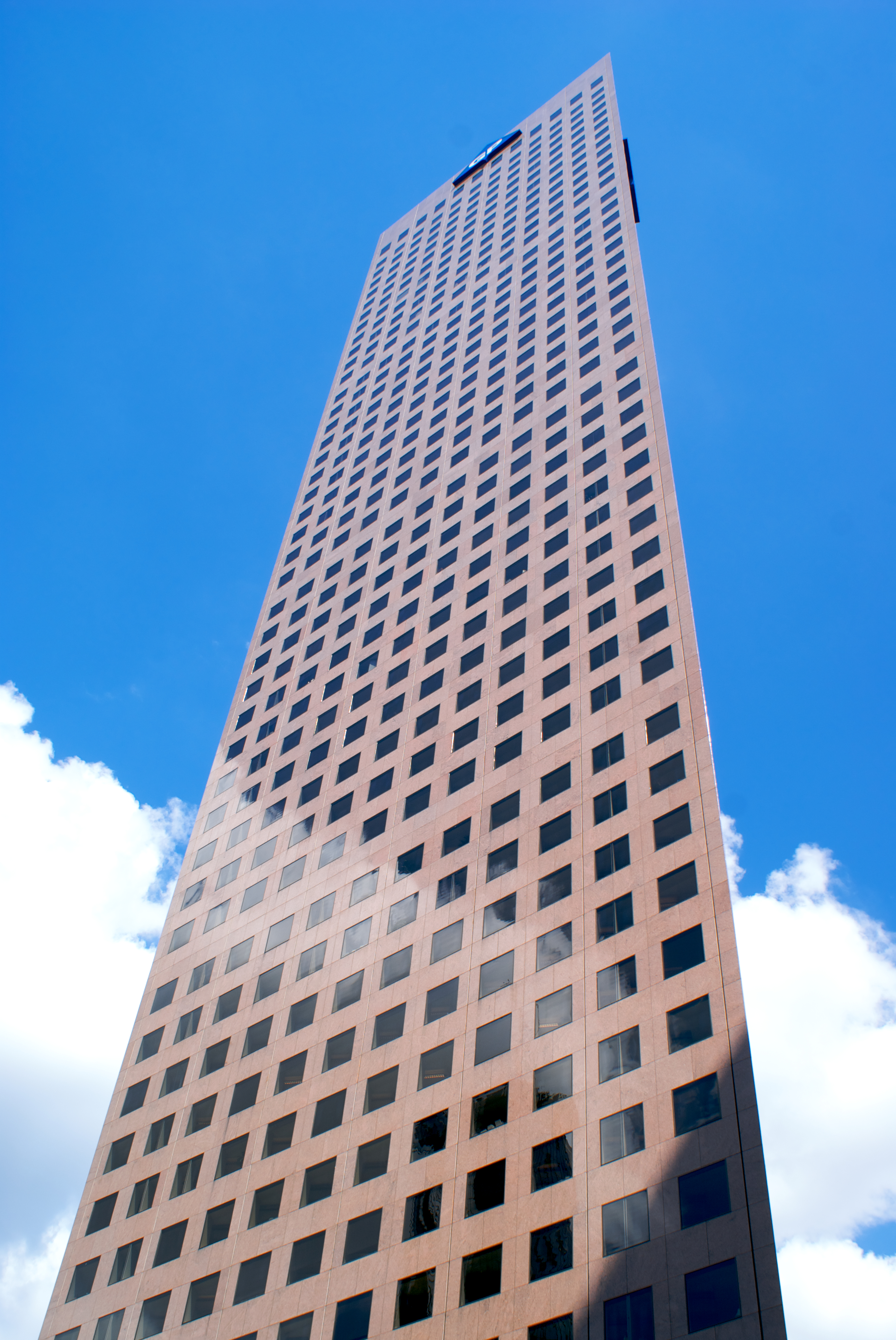

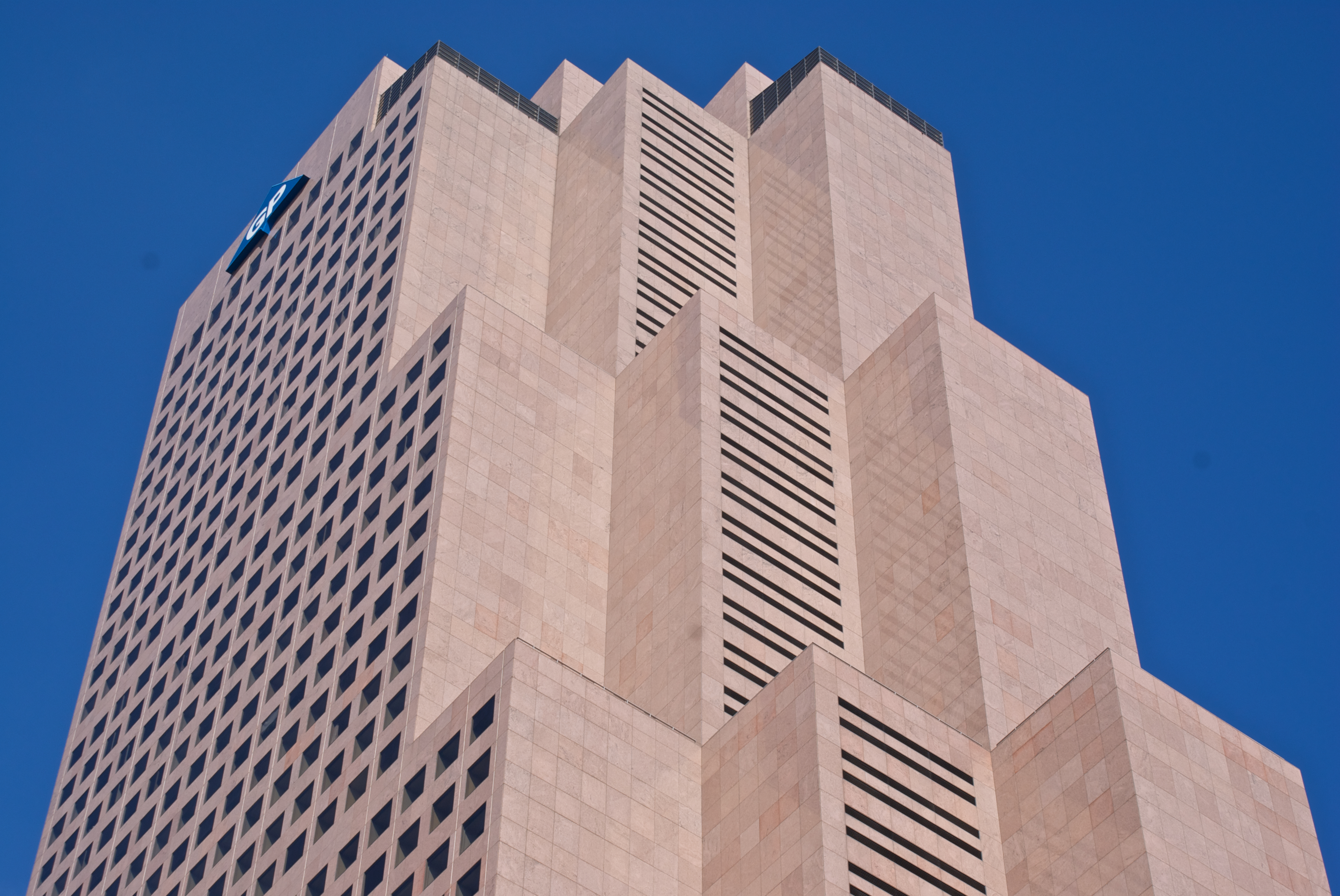

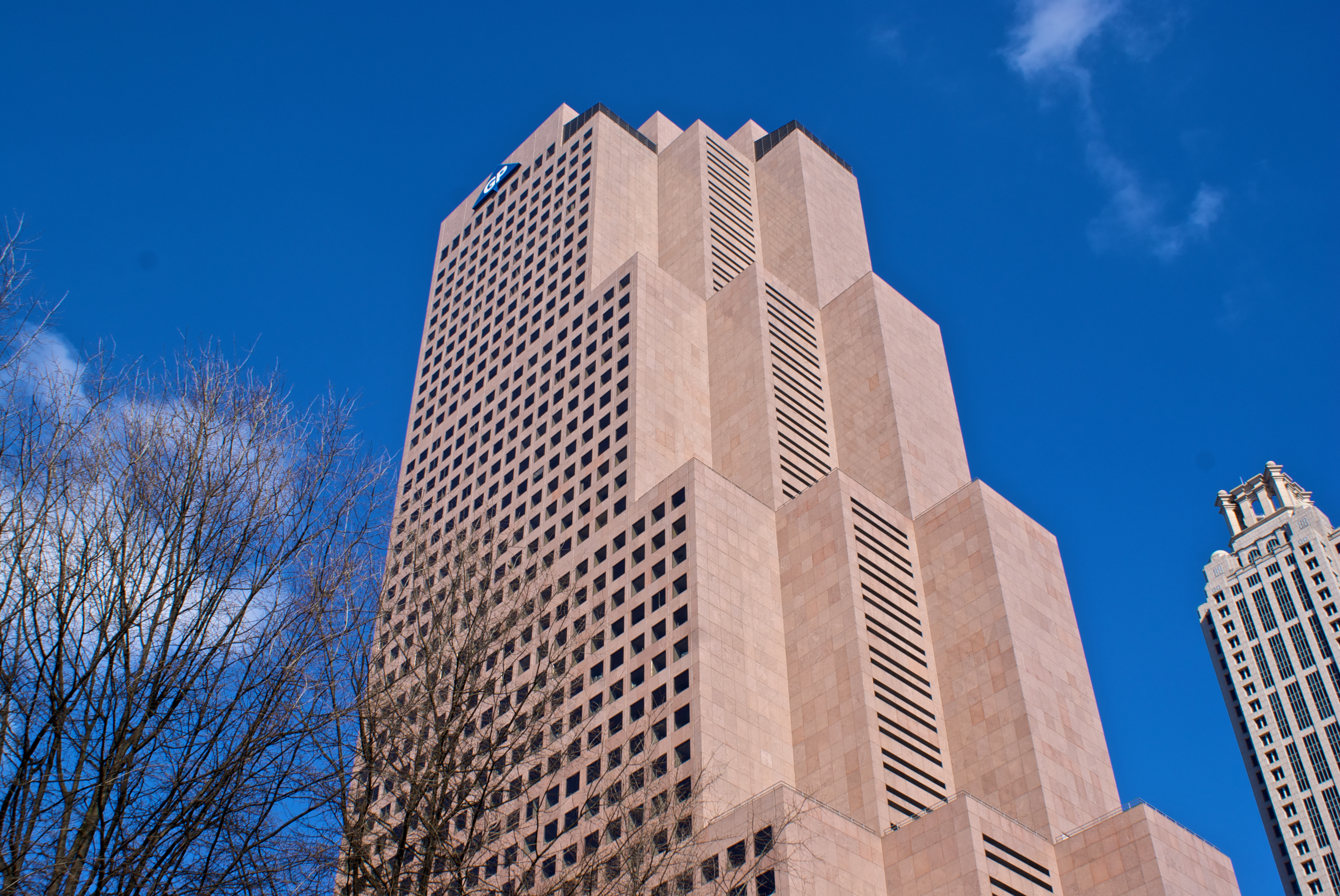

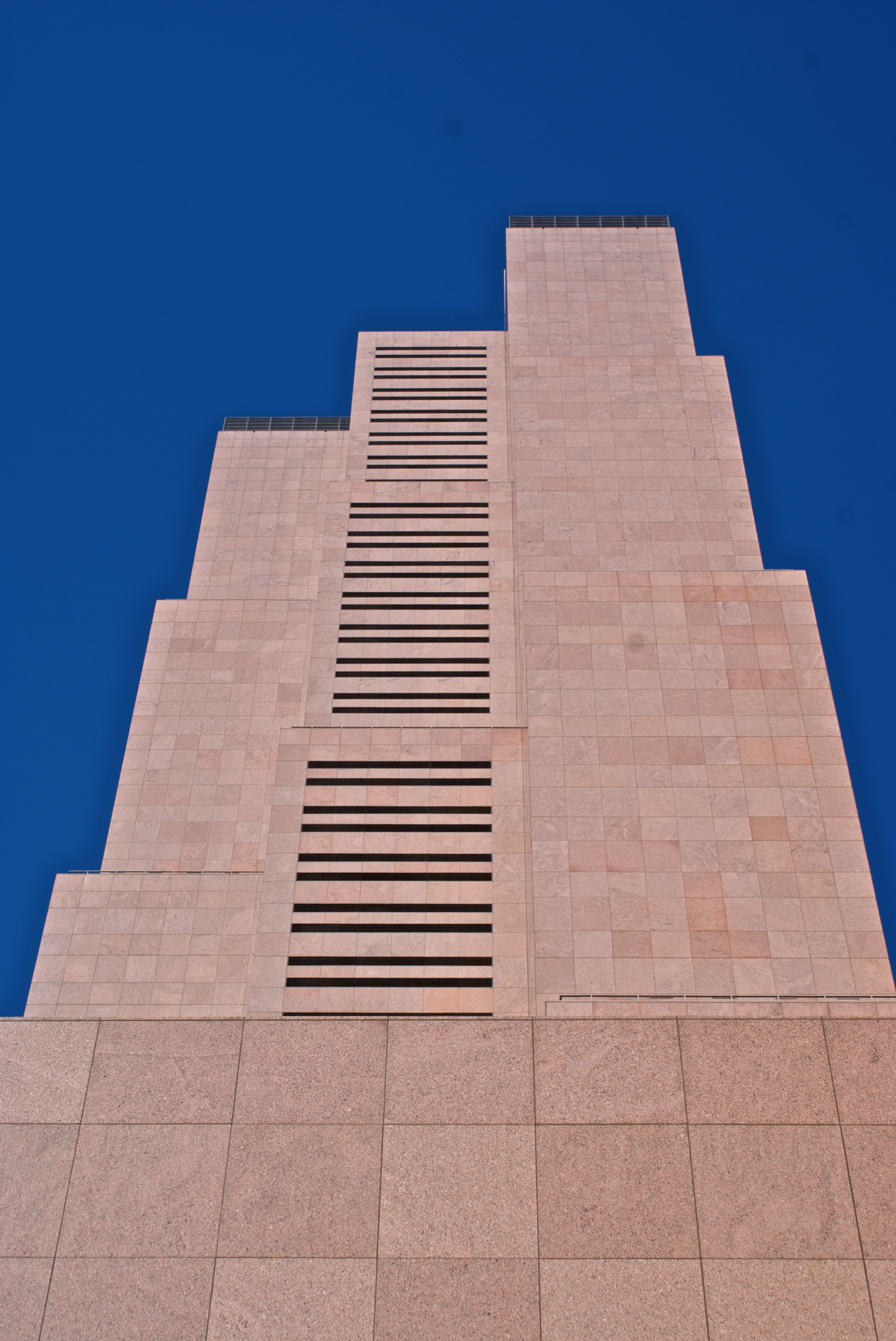

== See also ==
- List of tallest buildings in Atlanta
