= Owen Robertson Cheatham =

American businessman (1902–1970)

- Born: July 9, 1902; Concord, Campbell County, Virginia, U.S.
- Died: October 24, 1970 (aged 68); Eugene, Oregon, U.S.
- Resting place: New Concord Presbyterian Church Cemetery, Concord, Virginia
- Occupation: Businessman
- Years active: 1927–1970
- Organizations: Georgia-Pacific
- Known for: Founder of Georgia-Pacific
- Spouse: Celeste Wickliffe Cheatham (later O’Neil)

Owen Robertson Cheatham (1902–1970) was an American businessman. He founded Georgia-Pacific, a formerly publicly traded corporation on the New York Stock Exchange from 1949 to 2005, now a subsidiary of Koch Industries.

== Biography ==
=== Early life ===
Owen Robertson Cheatham was born on July 9, 1902, in Concord, Campbell County, Virginia. He attended New Concord Presbyterian Church in Concord.

=== Career ===
In 1927, he founded the Georgia Hardwood Lumber Co., (now known as Georgia-Pacific), a wholesaler of hardwood lumber headquartered in Augusta, Georgia. It was a publicly traded corporation on the New York Stock Exchange from 1949 to 2005. Under his tenure, it became a $750 million enterprise with a $1 billion+ asset base. The company became one of the world's leading manufacturers and distributors of tissue, pulp, paper, toilet paper, paper-towel dispenser, and other products. It is now a subsidiary of Koch Industries.

=== Personal life ===
He was married to Celeste Wickliffe Cheatham. She collected thirty-seven pieces of Dalí-Jewels, which were exhibited at the Virginia Museum of Fine Arts in Richmond, Virginia after her death. Cheatham died of a heart attack on October 24, 1970, at a football game in Eugene, Oregon. He was buried in the New Concord Presbyterian Church Cemetery. Following Cheatham's death, his widow Celeste Wickliffe Cheatham O'Neil was noted for her connection to the family's art holdings, including the Salvador Dalí jewelry pieces previously exhibited at the Virginia Museum of Fine Arts.

=== Legacy ===
The Owen R. Cheatham Memorial Garden and Monument on the grounds of the New Concord Presbyterian Church in Concord, Virginia, is named after him. The dedication of the garden took place on Sunday June 3, 1973.

The Owen Robertson Cheatham Gallery at Dartmouth College in Hanover, New Hampshire is named in his honor.

Cheatham Grove, a stand of old growth Redwood trees in California's Grizzly Creek Redwoods State Park, is named for him. The land, part of Georgia Pacific's larger timber holdings in the area, was donated to the state by Owen Cheatham in 1945.
