= Austin E. Cofrin =

American industrialist

Austin Ellsworth Cofrin (October 10, 1883 – May 27, 1980) was an American industrialist that founded the Fort Howard Paper Company in Green Bay, Wisconsin.

== Life ==
Cofrin was born in Bradford, New Hampshire, in 1883, to Paige Cofrin and Alfaretta Ward Cofrin. At age 13, Cofrin worked his family's farm after his father's death where he cultivated a strong work ethic that influenced a prosperous career. By age 16 Cofrin worked away from home and gained employment at a paper mill as a coating machine helper. After working a few years at various paper mills on the East Coast, Cofrin moved to Green Bay. His first job in Green Bay was at the Northern Paper Mill, where he worked as a supervisor. After working at the Northern Paper Mill, Cofrin and a few other employees of the mill started their own business. The mill was a small paper company that was known as the Fort Howard Corporation. In 1924 he was granted a patent for making crepe paper. Cofrin was president of the Fort Howard Corporation until his retirement in 1960, when his son John P. Cofrin took over the position. Cofrin died in 1980 at the age of 96.

== Fort Howard Corporation ==
The opening of the Fort Howard Corporation in 1919 on the Fox River (Wisconsin) paved the way for others in northeastern Wisconsin. The location of the paper mill was close to the fruitful timber industry and other natural resources in the region. Green Bay soon became a hub in the paper industry. Cofrin's hard work and resourcefulness was instrumental in the success of the Fort Howard Paper Company. His dedication to innovation helped lay the foundation for the paper industry as it is known today. Cofrin devoted much of his time to creating cutting-edge ideas that would forever change the way the paper industry did business. Fort Howard was the first paper mill to run nearly self-sufficiently. The mill housed a machine shop to build and service the paper converting equipment, which ensured speed and accuracy while cutting costs. Fort Howard produced many of their own chemicals used in the paper making process, as well as generating their own power to operate the mill, and maintained their own landfills for waste.

Cofrin was an early proponent of recycling waste paper to create a new type of usable paper. His vision for recycling continues to influence how paper and other raw materials like pulp and ground wood are recycled and reused today. Cofrin's work and early visions of environmentalism earned Fort Howard the first corporate award for national recycling in 1991 by the United States Environmental Protection Agency (EPA).

== Legacy ==
Cofrin was an accomplished philanthropist, and his family donates large amounts of money to the University of Wisconsin–Green Bay, through their 1883 and 1923 Funds. The Austin E. Cofrin School of Business, Mary Ann Cofrin Hall, and David A. Cofrin Library all carry the family name, and gifts from the family were essential in the construction of the Weidner Center For The Performing Arts. The family also, through those two funds, donates in to the University of Florida, (Cofrin's son's longtime home) where the family's donations fund the Harn Museum of Art, the Florida Museum of Natural History, and the University of Florida College of Medicine.
