= Temple-Inland =

Former paper company

Temple Inland, Inc.
- Industry: Pulp and paper
- Predecessor: Eastex Pulp and Paper Company; Inland Container; Gaylord Container Corporation
- Founded: 1925
- Fate: Acquired by International Paper in 2012
- Successor: Guaranty Bank; Forestar Group
- Headquarters: Austin, Texas, U.S.
- Area served: Worldwide
- Key people: Doyle R. Simons (Chairman and CEO)
- Revenue: ▲US$3.79 billion (2010)
- Net income: ▼US$168 million (2010)
- Total assets: ▲US$5.9 billion (2010)
- Total equity: ▲US$929 million (2010)
- Number of employees: 10,500 (2010)
- Parent: International Paper

Temple-Inland, Inc. was an American corrugated packaging and building products company. It was acquired by International Paper in 2012.

== History ==
Inland Container Corporation was founded by Herman C. Krannert as Anderson Box Company in Anderson, Indiana in 1918. Krannert then founded Inland Box Company in Indianapolis in 1925; this was considered the founding date of the company.

In 1973, Time, Inc. acquired Temple Industries, Inc., merging it with Eastex Pulp and Paper Company to form Temple-Eastex, Inc. Time Inc. had entered the forest products business in 1952 with the purchase of 500,000 acres of timberland in East Texas. In 1978, Inland was acquired by Time, Inc. in a deal worth about $280 million (equivalent to $1.382143×10^{9} in 2025). At the time, Inland was manufacturing corrugated shipping containers and container board at 28 plants in the United States and Puerto Rico. It also had 50% ownership, along with Mead paper Co., in Georgia Kraft Co. which produced 1.2 million tons of linerboard in 1977, and which owned 950,000 acres of timberland in the southeast U.S., and leased another 125,000 acres.

In 1983, Temple-Eastex, Inc. and Inland were spun off and combined into Temple-Inland, Inc. At the time, the companies accounted for $1.1 billion (equivalent to $3.669828×10^{9} in 2025) in revenues for Time, equivalent to 32 percent of Time Inc.'s consolidated revenues of $3.6 billion (equivalent to $1.2010345×10^{10} in 2025) in 1982. At the time it was reported that the Joe C. Denman Jr., chief executive of Temple-Eastex, and Clinton G. Ames Jr., chief executive of Inland Container, would continue as the chief executives of the entities under the new Temple-Inland which was headed up by Clifford J. Grum. Grum was executive vice president of Time Inc. and became the chief executive officer of the new company, which was based in Diboll, Texas. Arthur Temple Jr. (1920–2006), who had been president of Temple Industries when Time acquired it and later vice chairman of Time Inc., served as chairman of the board of the spun-off Temple-Inland until 1991. Grum retired in 2000.

In 2002, the company acquired the Gaylord Container Corporation. Gaylord engaged in the integrated production, conversion, and sale of brown paper-packaging products and manufactured corrugated containers, corrugated sheets, and containerboard.

== 2007 spin-off ==
In November 2007, Temple-Inland announced that it planned to separate itself into three stand-alone public companies and sell its timberlands by the end of 2007. Shareholders in the company would eventually receive stock in all three companies depending on the amount owned on the day the company split up. The three companies were:

- Temple-Inland Inc.
- Guaranty Financial Group Inc.
- Forestar Real Estate Group Inc.

=== Temple-Inland Inc. ===
Temple-Inland Inc. became a manufacturing company focused on corrugated packaging and building products. The vertically integrated corrugated packaging operation consisted of five linerboard mills, one corrugated medium mill and sixty-four converting facilities. The mills produced 3.5 million tons of containerboard per year and the converting facilities produced 3.6 million tons of corrugated packaging per year. The building products operations manufactured a variety of building products for new home construction, commercial and repair and remodeling markets.

=== Guaranty Financial Group Inc. ===
Logo of the now defunct bank

Guaranty Financial Group Inc. became a financial services holding company that operated in various business segments through its primary operating subsidiaries, "Guaranty Bank" and "Guaranty Insurance Services, Inc." Guaranty Bank became a federally chartered savings bank with total assets in excess of $16 billion (consolidated) that conducted consumer and business banking activities through a network of approximately 150 bank branches located in Texas and California that provided commercial banking products and services to various geographic markets throughout the United States. Guaranty Insurance Services, Inc. became an insurance agency that focused on property and casualty insurance with fixed annuities and operated out of 17 offices located in Texas and California, as well as through branches of Guaranty Bank.

In August 2009, Guaranty Bank was closed by the Office of Thrift Supervision, which appointed the Federal Deposit Insurance Corporation as receiver. To protect the depositors, the FDIC sold all of the deposits of Guaranty Bank to BBVA Compass of Birmingham, Alabama. At the time of its collapse, the bank had 103 branches in Texas and 59 branches in California.

=== Forestar Real Estate Group Inc. ===
Forestar Real Estate Group Inc. became a dual business operating company focusing in two business segments: real estate and natural resources. The real estate segment owns directly or through ventures about 374,000 acres of real estate located in nine states and twelve markets in the U.S. The real estate segment has 24 real estate projects representing about 27,000 acres currently in the entitlement process and 75 active development projects in seven states and 11 markets encompassing approximately 17,000 acres. These are 30,000 residential lots and 1,900 commercial acres. The natural resources segment manages about 622,000 net acres of oil and gas mineral interests, sells wood fiber from its land primarily located in Georgia, and leases land for recreational uses.

As of September 30, 2015 Forestar, either directly or through ventures, owned:

- 106,000 acres of low basis real estate located in 12 states and 15 markets (approximately)
- 9 commercial and residential (multi-family) properties
- 590,000 net mineral acres, principally in Texas, Louisiana, Alabama and Georgia
- 324,000 net mineral acres in oil-rich basins (leasehold interest), including 9,000 net mineral acres in the core of the Bakken and Three Forks formations.

In addition, they manage approximately 95,000 acres of land as timberland, generating fiber growth and sales. They also have approximately 1.5 million acres of water interests in Texas, Louisiana, Alabama and Georgia.

== 2012 sale ==

In 2012, International Paper, through the merger of its wholly owned subsidiary Metal Acquisition Inc. with and into Temple-Inland, acquired Temple-Inland in a deal valued at $4.5 billion. Temple-Inland then became a wholly owned subsidiary of International Paper. At the time of sale, Temple-Inland's corrugated packaging operation consisted of 7 mills and 59 converting facilities as well as the building products operation.

== Environmental record ==
In 2002, researchers at the University of Massachusetts Amherst identified Temple–Inland as the 24th-largest corporate producer of air pollution in the United States. Major pollutants reported by the study included acrolein, manganese compounds, sulfuric acid, formaldehyde, and acetaldehyde. Temple-Inland did not appear on the 2010 PERI Toxic 100 Air Polluters report.

== See also ==
- International Paper
- Forestar Real Estate Group Inc.
- Guaranty Financial Group Inc.
- Gaylord Container Corporation
