= Fort James Corporation =

American pulp and paper company

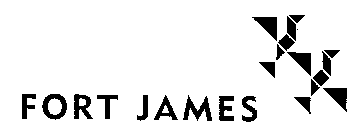
- Industry: Pulp and paper
- Predecessor: Fort Howard Paper Company; James River Corporation
- Founded: 1997; 29 years ago
- Defunct: 2000; 26 years ago
- Fate: Acquired by Georgia-Pacific
- Successor: Georgia-Pacific
- Headquarters: Deerfield, Illinois, U.S.
- Key people: Michael Riordan, President and COO; Miles Marsh, Chairman and CEO
- Total assets: $7.3 billion
- Number of employees: 24,800

Fort James Corporation was an American pulp and paper company based in Deerfield, Illinois. Its products were sold under a variety of brand names, which included Brawny, Mardi Gras, and Quilted Northern.

At the time of its acquisition, Fort James Corporation was the United States' largest manufacturer of commercial tissue.

== History ==
In 1997, the Fort Howard Paper Company and the James River Corporation merged to form the Fort James Corporation. Fort Howard was headquartered in Green Bay, Wisconsin, and James River in Richmond, Virginia.

By 1999, Fort James was operating nine of the eleven largest 270-inch (22.5 ft; 6.9 m) wide tissue machines in the world.

In 2000, the Fort James Corporation was acquired by Georgia-Pacific (GP) for $11 billion; GP is based in Atlanta, Georgia.
