= Texas two-step bankruptcy =

Maneuver to access bankruptcy

A Texas two-step bankruptcy (sometimes just Texas two-step) is a two-step bankruptcy strategy under US bankruptcy law in which a solvent parent company spins off liabilities into a new company, and then has that new company declare bankruptcy. In the first step, the parent company undergoes a Texas divisive merger, which allows companies to split off their liabilities from their assets. In the second step, the newly created spin-off declares a chapter 11 bankruptcy, usually in North Carolina, where bankruptcy courts are perceived to be more open to this scheme. The Texas two-step allows solvent companies to shield their assets from litigants using protections that are normally reserved for bankrupt companies. The goal of a Texas two-step is for the parent company to gain a third-party release of all liabilities it assigned to its spinoff, thus preventing litigants from pursuing those claims against the parent.

== Texas divisive merger ==
Typically, a corporate merger involves two entities joining together so that the assets and liabilities of both become the assets and liabilities of the new, merged company. A Texas divisive merger achieves the opposite result: instead of two companies joining to become one, one company splits to become two. Corporate divisions or spin-offs are allowed in many jurisdictions, but the Texas divisive merger is distinctive because it treats the division as a merger. Notably, in a Texas two-step bankruptcy the parent company still maintains control over the spin-off by appointing its board and executives.

== Subsequent Chapter 11 bankruptcy ==
Once the parent company has created a spin-off containing the parent's former liabilities, the spin-off declares chapter 11 bankruptcy but remains in control as a debtor in possession. The chapter 11 bankruptcy automatically stays (halts) litigation against the spin-off, and the spin-off can further move to stay all litigation against its parent, which courts permit when the bankrupt company shows that litigation against the third party (here the parent) substantially harms the debtor's ability to complete a bankruptcy plan. However, while the spin-off is under the oversight of the bankruptcy court, the parent company can continue to operate normally. For instance, when Johnson & Johnson entered into a Texas two-step through its spin-off LTL Management LLC, J&J's other divisions continued to operate unencumbered, and J&J maintained its AAA credit rating.

The final goal of a company doing a Texas two-step is to get the court to approve a bankruptcy plan that includes a third-party release for the parent. Such a release prevents all litigants from recovering for their harms from the parent company. Third-party releases are controversial in their own right, but are explicitly allowed in asbestos-related bankruptcies, and have been used successfully in non-asbestos cases.

== Cases ==
While Texas divisive mergers have existed since 1989, only four companies have employed them to facilitate a subsequent bankruptcy to shield the parent company from tort liabilities as part of a Texas two-step. All four companies were represented by law firm Jones Day, although only three of the four have successfully navigated the process at this time.

In 2017, Koch Industries-owned Georgia-Pacific spun off its liabilities from paper and building products that contained asbestos into a new entity called Bestwall through a Texas divisive merger. Bestwall declared bankruptcy in North Carolina three months later.

In 2019, Saint-Gobain similarly spun off liabilities from building products produced by its North American subsidiary CertainTeed that contained asbestos into DBMP, which had no operations. DBMP filed for bankruptcy in North Carolina three months later.

In 2020, Trane Technologies followed the same pattern and spun off its asbestos-related liabilities into Aldrich Pump and Murray Boiler, both of which declared bankruptcy seven weeks later in North Carolina.

In 2021, Johnson & Johnson began the largest Texas two-step bankruptcy when it created LTL Management LLC to hold its asbestos-containing talc powder liabilities via a Texas divisive merger. On October 14, 2021, LTL Management LLC declared bankruptcy in North Carolina. On January 30, 2023 the U.S. Court of Appeals for the Third Circuit ruled that LTL's bankruptcy should be dismissed on the ground that the company was not in financial distress, reversing a previous ruling by the Bankruptcy Court. On April 4, 2023, LTL filed for a second bankruptcy. On July 28, 2023, Chief Judge Michael Kaplan of the U.S. Bankruptcy Court in New Jersey dismissed the second bankruptcy. On April 1, U.S. Bankruptcy Judge Christopher Lopez dismissed a third bankruptcy filing. Later in April 2025, U.S. Bankruptcy Judge Lopez denied requests by some plaintiffs lawyers to revive the bankruptcy.

== Criticism ==
Plaintiffs, legal scholars, and some legislators have criticized Texas two-steps as abuses of the bankruptcy system designed to prevent plaintiffs from recovering for their harms.

=== Fraudulent transfer ===
A fraudulent transfer is an illegal attempt to avoid paying a debt by transferring money to another person or entity. Critics have argued that a Texas divisive merger meets the definition of a fraudulent transfer when done in preparation for bankruptcy, because the divisive merger causes the spin-off to become insolvent (unable to pay its debts). Fraudulent transfers are prohibited by US bankruptcy laws. However, scholars have noted several obstacles to creditors bringing fraudulent transfer claims in bankruptcy. First, the Texas divisive merger law defines a divisive merger as occurring without "any transfer or assignment". Without a transfer, there can be no fraudulent transfer. However, this issue has never been fully litigated, and courts could conclude that a Texas divisive merger meets the definition of a transfer regardless of the language in the law.

Second, scholars also note that the larger hurdle to creditors may actually be the cost and delay of litigating a fraudulent transfer claim. Third, fraudulent transfer claims belong in the first instance to the bankrupt entity, so to pursue such a claim the executives of the bankrupt spin-off would have to agree to sue the parent company, the same parent company that installed those executives in the first place. This increases the cost to creditors of litigating the transfer even more, and, together with the uncertainty about whether a Texas divisive merger constitutes a transfer in the first place, could result in creditors accepting a discounted settlement offer (which would guarantee payment and avoid the risks and costs of lengthy litigation).

=== Bad-faith bankruptcy ===
While US bankruptcy law does not explicitly define bankruptcy "in bad faith", courts have routinely applied certain standards, and creditors can bring motions to dismiss bankruptcies for bad faith. Types of bad-faith bankruptcies include those in which a new company is created for the purpose of filing bankruptcy, and when a company uses bankruptcy for an improper purpose, such as reducing debts that it would be able to pay outside of bankruptcy. When a court rules that a bankruptcy was filed in bad faith and dismisses it, the company loses the protections of bankruptcy and cannot discharge its liabilities.

Texas two-step proponents, like Johnson & Johnson and its lawyers, have argued that Texas two-steps are not inherently bad-faith, and that in the context of mass-tort litigation bankruptcy is fairest way to address large numbers of personal injury claims. Unlike in traditional courts hearing cases brought by many different people, bankruptcies must treat all similar claimants similarly.

In Johnson & Johnson's first attempt to employ the Texas two-step, bankruptcy judge Michael Kaplan ruled that handling complex litigation brought by many different plaintiffs was a legitimate use of bankruptcy. Many of those plaintiffs disagreed and argued that Johnson & Johnson's goal was to protect itself from having to pay plaintiffs for the injuries it caused, and together with the US government appealed the ruling to the U.S. Court of Appeals for the Third Circuit. The 3rd Circuit overturned the bankruptcy court's decision and ruled that LTL Management LLC's bankruptcy should be dismissed on the grounds that it was not filed in good faith, because LTL's funding agreement with Johnson & Johnson meant that LTL was never in financial distress. J&J's second and third attempts were also subsequently denied.
