= Forestar Group =

Real Estate company based in Texas

Forestar Group Inc.
- Type: Public
- Traded as: NYSE: FOR; Russell 2000 Component
- Industry: Real Estate
- Headquarters: Arlington, Texas
- Area served: United States
- Website: forestar.com

Forestar Group Inc. is a residential lot development company based in Arlington, Texas. The company has operations in 51 markets in 21 states and delivered 11,518 residential lots during the twelve-month period ended December 31, 2020. The company is publicly traded on the New York Stock Exchange and in October 2017 became a majority-owned subsidiary of D.R. Horton, Inc., the largest homebuilder by volume in the United States since 2002. The company primarily acquires entitled real estate and develops it into finished residential lots for sale to homebuilders with a strategic focus on asset turns and efficiency.

== Overview ==
The company manages all operations through its real estate segment.

The majority of Forestar's real estate projects are single-family residential communities. The Company develops lots for single-family homes on sites typically purchased in the open market and sells residential lots primarily to local, regional and national homebuilders. Forestar acquires land for use in its development operations after the company has completed due diligence and after it has obtained the rights (known as entitlements) to begin development work resulting in an acceptable number of residential lots. Forestar's strategy is focused on making investments in land acquisition and development to expand its residential lot development business across a geographically diversified national platform and consolidate market share in the fragmented U.S. lot development industry. The Company primarily invests in short duration, phased development projects that generate returns similar to production-oriented homebuilders. Forestar also makes short-term investments in finished lots (lot banking) and undeveloped land with the intent to sell these assets within a short time period.

== Company history ==
The company's origins date back to the 1955 incorporation of Lumbermen's Investment Corporation, which in 2006 changed its name to Forestar (USA) Real Estate Group Inc. The company has a long legacy of residential and commercial real estate development operations, primarily in Texas. In 1991, Forestar and Cousins Properties Incorporated formed Temco Associates, LLC as a venture to develop residential sites in Paulding County, Georgia, and in 2002 Forestar and Cousins formed CL Realty, L.L.C. as a venture to develop residential and mixed-use communities in Texas and across the southeastern U.S. Those ventures continue today. In 2001, Forestar opened an office in the Atlanta area to manage nearby land with a focus on its long-term real estate development potential. In 2006, Temple-Inland Inc. began reporting Forestar Real Estate Group as a separate business segment. On December 28, 2007, Temple-Inland distributed 100% of the issued and outstanding shares of Forestar's common stock to its shareholders. In September 2012, Forestar acquired CREDO Petroleum, an oil and gas exploration, development and production company with leasehold interests in over 135,000 net mineral acres.

In October 2017, Forestar became a majority-owned subsidiary of D.R. Horton, Inc. Immediately following the merger, D.R. Horton owned 75% of Forestar's outstanding common stock, and as of June 30, 2026, D.R. Horton owned 62% of Forestar's outstanding common stock. In connection with the merger, Forestar and D.R. Horton entered into certain agreements, including a Stockholders' Agreement, a Master Supply Agreement and a Shared Services Agreement.

== Market shares ==
On 8 June 2020, Forestar Group Inc.'s market value currently stands at $771.95 million. In the past year, Forestar Group Inc's securities have moved between $23.12 and $9.44.

=== Stock ===
On 12 June 2020, Forestar Group Inc. CFO James Douglas Allen in a deal purchased 5,200 shares of the company 's stock. The shares were purchased at an average price of $14.41 per share, with a $74,932.00 purchase value.
