= James River Corporation =

Pulp and paper company

- Industry: Pulp and paper
- Founded: 1969; 57 years ago
- Defunct: 1997; 29 years ago
- Fate: Merged with Fort Howard Paper Company
- Successor: Fort James Corporation
- Headquarters: Richmond, Virginia, U.S.
- Key people: Miles Marsh, CEO
- Revenue: ▼$5.7 billion (1996)
- Net income: ▲$157 million (1996)
- Number of employees: 23,000

James River Corporation was an American pulp and paper company based in Richmond, Virginia, once the largest paper manufacturer in the world.

== History ==
The company was founded in 1969 as the James River Paper Company by Brenton Halsey and Robert Williams, with the purchase of Ethyl Corporation's Specialty Papers Division. Halsey and Williams were both former employees of Albemarle Paper Manufacturing Company; the city of Richmond lies along the James River.

The company changed its name to the James River Corporation in 1973, and it acquired the Brown Company subsidiary of Gulf and Western Industries in 1980 and the Dixie/Northern division of American Can Company in 1982.

In 1986, James River acquired the fine paper mill assets of Crown Zellerbach, headquartered in San Francisco, and became the largest paper manufacturer in the world. The brown paper division of CZ was not in the deal and became Gaylord Container Corporation. Crown Zellerbach had been the target of a hostile takeover by Sir James Goldsmith.

James River began producing 100 percent recycled paper products in 1991 at its mill in Green Bay, Wisconsin. Some of the products included Recycled Northern Bath Tissue, Recycled Brawn Towels, and Recycled Northern Napkins. Also that year, the company sold twenty-two paper mills to Specialty Coatings Group.

In 1997, the company merged with the Fort Howard Paper Company of Green Bay, forming the Fort James Corporation. At the time of their merger, James River was one of the largest paper manufacturers, with 60 manufacturing facilities in North America and Europe. Three years later in 2000, Fort James was acquired by Georgia-Pacific, based in Atlanta.

In 1998, Halsey and Williams, the company's founders, were both inducted into the Paper Industry International Hall of Fame.

== Legacy ==
The historical records of the James River Corporation are housed at the Virginia Historical Society.
