= Fort Howard Paper Company =

Pulp and paper company

- Industry: Pulp and paper
- Founded: 1919; 107 years ago
- Founder: Austin E. Cofrin
- Defunct: 1997; 29 years ago
- Fate: Merged with James River Corporation
- Successor: Fort James Corporation
- Headquarters: Green Bay, Wisconsin, U.S.

Fort Howard Paper Company was an American pulp and paper company based in Green Bay, Wisconsin. Its products were sold under a variety of brand names, including Envision, Fort Howard, Mardi Gras, and Soft'n Gentle.

The company merged with James River Corporation in 1997 to form the Fort James Corporation; it became part of Georgia-Pacific in 2000.

== History ==
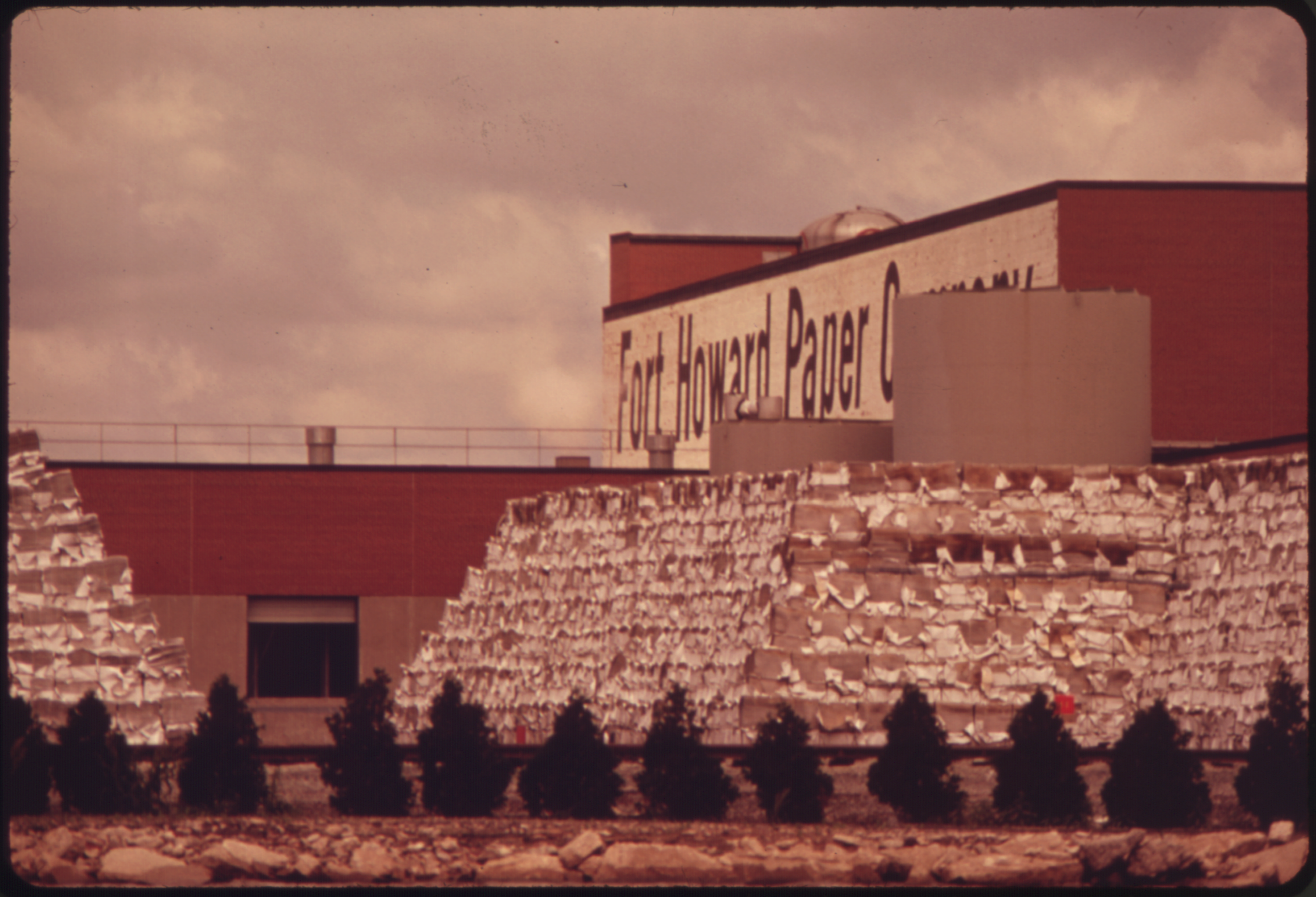
Paper bales outside the Green Bay mill

Austin E. Cofrin founded the Fort Howard Paper Company in 1919. It was named after Fort Howard, a 19th century U.S. Army fortification located along the west bank of the Fox River in Green Bay.

In the 1930s, the company began experimenting with recycled paper production.

In 1960, Austin E. Cofrin stepped down as CEO, and handed control of the company to his son, John P. Cofrin.

In 1971, the company was taken public, and common stock was offered.

In 1976, the company began construction on its second facility in Muskogee, Oklahoma.

In 1980, the company acquired The Harmon Group of New York City. They also expanded internationally by acquiring The Sterling Group of Manchester, England.

In 1983, they purchased the Maryland Cup Corporation, the largest manufacturer of paper and plastic food products.

In 1988, the company was taken private, and in 1989 they sold their cup operations, because it was not cost effective.

In 1997, the company merged with another paper company, the James River Corporation. The new company became the Fort James Corporation. Three years later, the Fort James Corporation was acquired by Georgia-Pacific.

== Awards ==
In 1990, the Fort Howard Paper Company was recognized with the Environmental Protection Agency Administrator’s Award for Recycling Leadership.

In 1991, they received the National Recycling Coalition Award for Recycling Innovation as well as the American Paper Institute’s Environmental and Energy Achievement Award.

== Legacy ==
The historical records of the Fort Howard Paper Company are housed at the Area Research Center at the University of Wisconsin-Green Bay.
