= Georgia-Pacific =

American wood pulp and paper company

Georgia-Pacific LLC

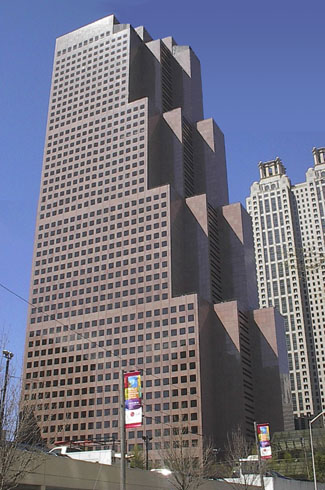
- Georgia-Pacific Tower, the headquarters of Georgia-Pacific in Atlanta, Georgia.
- Type: Subsidiary
- Traded as: NYSE: GP
- Industry: Pulp and paper
- Founded: 1927; 99 years ago, in Augusta, Georgia, U.S.
- Founder: Owen Robertson Cheatham
- Headquarters: Georgia-Pacific Tower, Atlanta, Georgia, United States
- Number of employees: 35,000 (3Q 2019)
- Parent: Koch Industries
- Website: www.gp.com

Georgia-Pacific LLC is an American pulp and paper company based in Atlanta, Georgia, and is one of the world's largest manufacturers and distributors of tissue, pulp, paper, toilet and paper towel dispensers, packaging, building products and related chemicals, and other forest products—largely made from its own timber. Since 2005, it has been an independently operated and managed subsidiary of Koch Industries. As of fall 2019, the company employed more than 35,000 people at more than 180 locations in North America, South America and Europe.

== History ==
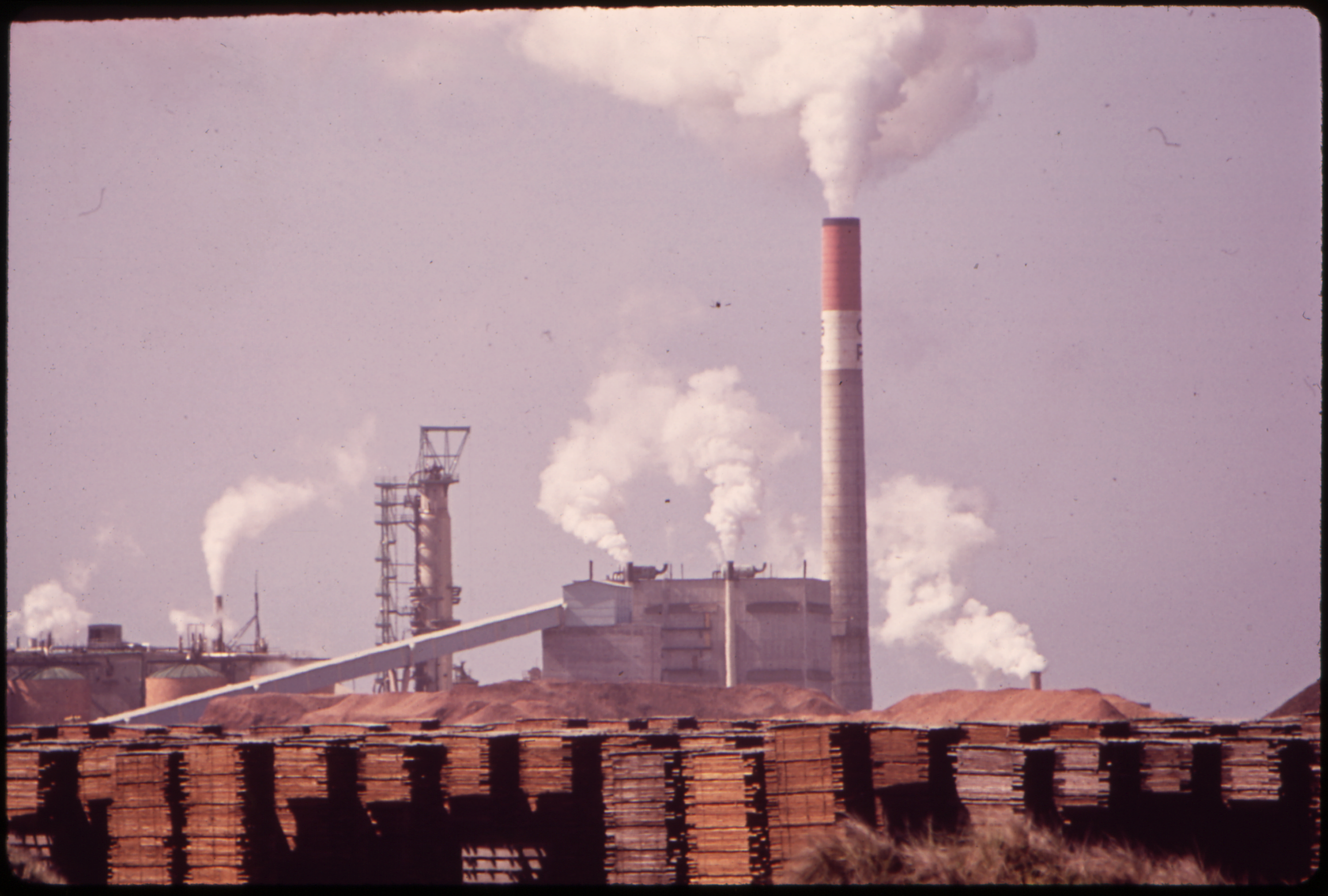
Georgia-Pacific lumber mill in Samoa, California (May 1972).

Georgia-Pacific was founded by Owen Robertson Cheatham on September 22, 1927 in Augusta, Georgia, as the Georgia Hardwood Lumber Co. He started the company through the acquisition of a wholesale hardwood lumber yard. The nascent company encountered difficulties two years after its incorporation as the United States fell into the Great Depression. Due to slow demand, the company had only five employees in 1934. Over the years it expanded, adding sawmills and plywood plants. The company acquired its first West Coast facility in 1947 and changed its name to Georgia-Pacific Plywood & Lumber Company in 1948.

In 1956, the company changed its name to Georgia-Pacific Corporation. In 1957—led by new president Robert B. Pamplin (who would lead for two decades)—the company entered the pulp and paper business by building a kraft pulp and linerboard mill at Toledo, Oregon. This was the only pulp and paper mill that the company ever built. The company continued to make a series of acquisitions, including Union Lumber (owned by Boise Cascade) in 1973, US Plywood in 1987, American Forest Products Corporation in 1988, Great Northern Nekoosa in 1990, and the Fort James Corporation in 2000. The Fort James Corporation was the result of a series of mergers that included the Fort Howard Corporation, the James River Corporation and Crown-Zellerbach.

In 1996, Georgia-Pacific sold its operations in Martell, California and its surrounding timberlands to Sierra Pacific Industries. In 1999, Georgia-Pacific sold its California timber lands to Hawthorne Timber. In 2000, Georgia-Pacific sold its remaining timber lands to Plum Creek Timber. In August 2001, Georgia-Pacific completed the sale of four un-coated paper mills and their associated businesses and assets to Canadian papermaker Domtar for US$1.65 billion.

It was announced on November 13, 2005 that Georgia-Pacific would be acquired by Koch Industries. On December 23, 2005, Koch Industries finalized the $21 billion acquisition. Georgia-Pacific was removed from the NYSE (it had traded under the symbol GP) and shareholders surrendered their shares for about $48 per share.

The Georgia-Pacific Tower in Atlanta continues to house the company's headquarters. The Crown Zellerbach Building was built as the headquarters of Crown Zellerbach in San Francisco in 1959.

On January 11, 2010, Georgia-Pacific signed an agreement to acquire Grant Forest Products' oriented strand board ("OSB") facility at Englehart, Ontario and the associated facility at Earlton, Ontario, as well as its OSB facilities at Clarendon and Allendale, South Carolina, for approximately $400 million. The transaction closed in July 2013, following Canadian regulatory review and US court approval under the Hart–Scott–Rodino merger review process.

On June 19, 2014, Georgia-Pacific announced it would acquire SPG Holdings.

In November 2017, Georgia-Pacific engaged in a corporate restructuring process using a legal maneuver known as the Texas Two-Step, wherein it divided its assets and liabilities into two separate entities. Bestwall, the newly formed subsidiary company housing all of Georgia-Pacific’s asbestos liabilities, then relocated to North Carolina, where it declared bankruptcy, which paused over 64,000 personal injury claims.

In 2018, Georgia-Pacific's facilities in Taylorsville, Mississippi were the site of a two-week labor strike.

In 2025, the company acquired Anchor Packaging, a prominent manufacturing company in Northeast Arkansas.

In May 2026, Georgia-Pacific announced a $191-million modernization of its oriented strand board (OSB) mill in Englehart, Ontario, supported by a $10 million investment from the Ontario Government. The project is expected to preserve more than 220 jobs and improve production efficiency.

== Brand names ==
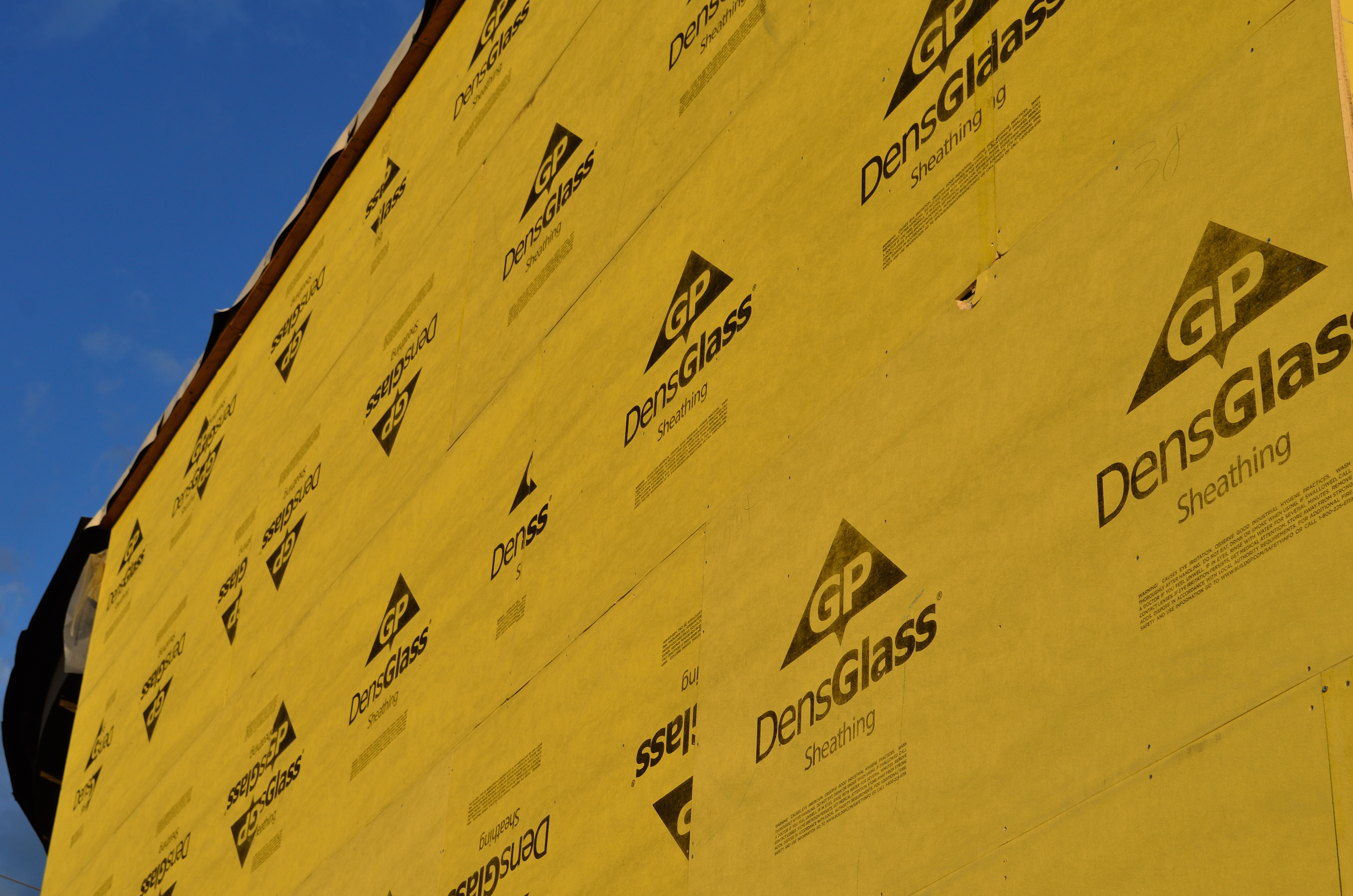
DensGlass Sheathing

Georgia-Pacific operates under many different brand names.

- Angel Soft and Quilted Northern are toilet paper and facial tissue brands.
- Blue Ribbon, Clutter Cutter, DensArmor Plus, DensDeck, DensGlass, DensShield, DryPly, FireGuard, GP Lam, Hushboard, Nautilus, Ply-Bead, Plytanium, Southern Gold, Sta-Strait, Thermostat, ToughRock, Wood I Beam, and XJ 85 are building and remodeling brands.
- Sparkle and Brawny are paper towel brands.
- Vanity Fair is a premium napkin brand.
- Dixie Insulair, PerfecTouch, and Ultra are tableware brands.
- Advantage, Image Plus, and Spectrum are office paper brands.

Discontinued brands include Soft n' Gentle (toilet paper), Zee (napkins and paper towels), and Mardi Gras (napkins and paper towels). The toilet paper and paper towel brands are sold in different price segments, with the Angel Soft and Sparkle brands being more value-priced and the Quilted Northern and Brawny brands being premium offerings.

== Environmental record ==
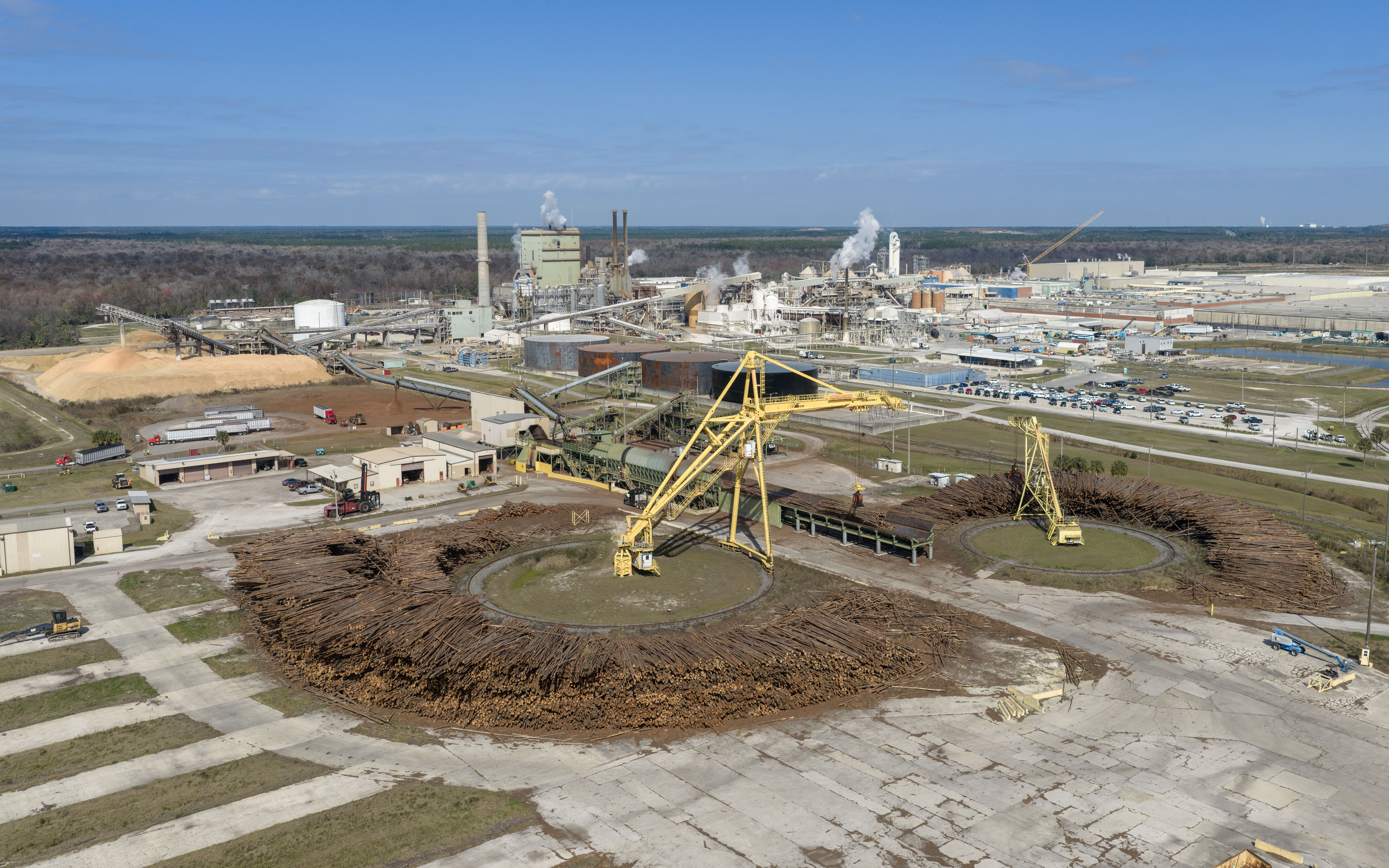
Georgia-Pacific paper mill in Palatka, Florida

Stephen Engelberg of The New York Times wrote that in 1995, Georgia-Pacific persuaded the U.S. Senate Judiciary Committee to approve an amendment that derailed a pending EPA investigation of Weyerhaeuser Company, Louisiana-Pacific Corporation, and Georgia-Pacific, arguing that the EPA was "unfairly applying present-day standards to decisions made 10 to 15 years ago", and that the EPA test method overstated the emissions from wood products factories. Georgia-Pacific's opponents believed "the measure could allow Georgia-Pacific avoid installing pollution gear at many of its plants." Engelberg wrote, "Nonetheless, [Georgia-Pacific] said they would install controls at plants that need them."

Georgia-Pacific is also involved in several remediation sites, many of which were landfills used by other manufacturers, municipalities and other businesses, and individuals. Two of the primary remediation sites - the Fox River in Wisconsin and Kalamazoo River in Michigan - involve the cleanup of PCBs. Georgia-Pacific is contributing to dam removal work as part of an effort to clean up PCB contamination in Kalamazoo.

In 2007, the EPA announced legal agreements among itself, Michigan, Georgia-Pacific, and Millennium Holdings (a corporate successor of the Allied Paper Corporation) requiring the companies to clean up an estimated $21 million worth of environmental damage to the Plainwell Impoundment Area. Another settlement required an additional $15 million of environmental work on the Kalamazoo River Superfund Site.

Georgia-Pacific is the largest user of de-ink fiber in the world, and its subsidiary company GP Harmon trades in the recycled material. The company has expanded into other markets in countries like Mexico and China. In 2005, president of the division Simon Davies estimated that China would require the import of scrap paper from the US and elsewhere for at least 15 years. In the long run, he asserted, the growth of the Chinese middle class would be correlated with a large increase in paper production, and having viable paper recovery systems in place would be of great value to them.

The Georgia-Pacific paper mill in Crossett, Arkansas was the subject of environmental documentary film Company Town, released in 2016. The film alleges that improper waste disposal by the mill has caused a cluster of cancer incidents in the area around the mill.

== Awards and charity ==
In 2009, the EPA awarded Koch subsidiary Georgia-Pacific its SmartWay Excellence award, "an innovative collaboration between the U.S. Environmental Protection Agency (EPA) and the freight industry designed to increase energy efficiency while significantly reducing air pollution," and specifically commended Georgia-Pacific. The award states:

In, 2008, 93 percent of Georgia-Pacific's freight was hauled by SmartWay Transport Partners, an increase of 47 percent over the previous year. Of the 145 carriers Georgia-Pacific uses, 104 were SmartWay carriers, an increase of 33 percent over 2007. In 2008, Georgia-Pacific experienced tremendous growth in its intermodal shipping. Georgia-Pacific was able to work with its customers to increase lead-time and create more intermodal freight shipments without significantly impacting customer's needs, thus increasing intermodal loads by 39 percent in 2008 as compared to 2007. Georgia-Pacific uses advanced software to pack loads more efficiently and increase cube utilization in its trailers. The company also reduced empty loads by 10 percent, increased utilization of local fleets, and established an idling reduction policy in place at its 12 distribution centers. In the summer of 2008, Georgia Pacific held a fuel conservation summit to explore ways for shippers and carriers to work together to further reduce fuel consumption from its freight transport operations.

The Georgia-Pacific Foundation Scholarship Program for Employees' Children has awarded nearly $10.5 million in college scholarships to children of the company's employees between 1988 and 2013.
