= Gee =

Gee is the phonetic pronunciation of the letter G.

Gee or GEE may also refer to:

== People ==
- Gee (surname)
- Gee (nickname)
  - Gee Tucker (born 1946), American actress

== Music ==
- Gee Records, an American record label
- Gee (EP), a 2009 EP by Girls' Generation
- "Gee" (The Crows song), 1953
- "Gee" (Girls' Generation song), 2009

== Science and technology ==
- Gee (navigation) or GEE, a British radio-navigation system used by the Royal Air Force during World War II
- Generalized estimating equation
- Gee, a unit of g-force
- Google Earth Engine, a GIS cloud-computing platform
- MIL-I-24768/2 type GEE, a PCB material

== Places ==
=== Australia ===
- George Town Aerodrome, IATA airport code "GEE"

=== France ===
- Gée, a commune

=== United States ===
- Gee, Kentucky, an unincorporated community
- Gee Hill, a summit in Tennessee
- Gee Creek (Florida)
- Gee Creek (Washington)

== Other uses ==
- Al Giardello, a fictional character on the television drama Homicide: Life on the Street
- An uncommon synonym for a horse
- A command to a mule to turn right, vs. haw for left

== See also ==
- Gee v Pritchard, a landmark UK Chancery court judgment
- G (disambiguation)
- Gees, a village in the Netherlands
- Ghee (disambiguation)
- Gi (disambiguation)
- Ji (disambiguation)
- Jih (disambiguation)
