= G (disambiguation) =

G is the seventh letter of the Latin alphabet.

G may also refer to:

== Arts, entertainment, and media ==
=== Fictional characters ===
- G, in the game Club Penguin
- G, in Sega's The House of the Dead series
- G, in Kuu Kuu Harajuku
- G (Street Fighter), in the Street Fighter series
- Mr G, or Mr Gregson, in the Australian TV comedy Summer Heights High

=== Films ===
- G (2002 film), by Christopher Scott Cherot
- G (2004 film), a documentary about methamphetamine use among the Navajo
- The G (film), 2023, written, directed, and produced by Karl R. Hearne

=== Literature ===
- G. (novel), by John Berger
- G (magazine)
- The Septuagint, the oldest extant translation of the Hebrew scriptures into Greek, referred to in biblical criticism as G (short for "Greek")

=== Music ===
==== Notation ====
- G (musical note)
- G major chord; see chord names and symbols (popular music)

==== Albums ====
- G. (album), by Swiss band Gotthard
- G (Gerald Levert album)
- G (King Creosote album)
- G (Giorgia album)

==== Other music ====
- "G", a song by Avenged Sevenfold from Life Is But a Dream...
- Prefix used to denote entries of the Gérard catalog of Luigi Boccherini's works

=== Rating systems ===
G is a common type of content rating that applies to media entertainment, such as films, television shows and computer games, generally denoting "General Audience" or "General Patronage" meaning that access is not restricted. The "G" rating is further documented at Motion picture content rating system and Television content rating system. The following organizations all use a "G" rating:

- Australian Classification Board
- Canadian motion picture rating system
- Eirin (Japan)
- Irish Film Classification Office
- Media Development Authority (Singapore)
- Motion Picture Association of America film rating system
- Movie and Television Review and Classification Board (Philippines)
- Office of Film and Literature Classification (New Zealand)

=== Television ===
- The Sensorites, a 1964 Doctor Who serial (production code "G")
- TV Gazeta, a Brazilian television network, which has used the "G" logo in São Paulo since 2000

=== Other uses in arts and media ===
- Radio and television call signs in the UK (ITU prefix "G")

== Business and finance ==
- The Gillette Company, ticker symbol G on the New York Stock Exchange
- G, US slang for a thousand dollars
- 'g', the growth rate, in the dividend discount model approach to financial valuation
- G (or the more specific G-4 or G-6), a relatively poor grade of collectable coin

== Science, technology, and mathematics ==
=== In astrophysics ===
- G, a stellar classification for yellowish stars
- G, part of a provisional designation in astronomy for any comet, asteroid, or minor planet discovered between April 1 and 15

=== In chemistry and biology ===
- ATC code G, Genito-urinary system and sex hormones, a section of the Anatomical Therapeutic Chemical Classification System
- G-spot, a conjectured erogenous zone
- Ganesha (psychedelic) (G), a psychedelic drug
- G protein, a family of proteins
- Gamma-Hydroxybutyric acid, a drug more commonly known as GHB
- Glycine, an amino acid
- Guanosine, a nucleoside
- Haplogroup G (mtDNA), a human mitochondrial haplogroup
- Haplogroup G (Y-DNA), a Y-chromosome haplogroup

=== In computing ===
- "G", the visual programming language LabVIEW is based on
- G, deprecated prefix for memory sizes of 1024^{3}

=== In linguistics ===
- ɢ, a symbol in IPA for voiced uvular plosive
- ɡ, a symbol in IPA for voiced velar stop
- Komi Sje, the Cyrillic letter Ԍ

=== In mathematics ===
- $G$, Catalan's constant
- $G$, Graham's number
- $g$, a metric tensor
- $G$, any of various $G$-functions
- $g$, Hedges' g, a measure of effect size

=== In physics ===
==== With respect to electromagnetism ====
- Gauss (unit), a unit of magnetic induction
- G, electrical conductance
- G band (disambiguation), with several meanings

==== With respect to gravitation ====
- Einstein tensor, $G$, in general relativity
- Gravitational constant, G, an empirical physical constant
- Graviton (G), a fundamental particle theorized to mediate the gravitational interaction
- Gravity of Earth, g, the local acceleration due to gravity
  - g-force, sustained acceleration of mass that causes a perception of weight
  - Standard gravity (g_{0} or g_{n}), the standardised acceleration due to gravity on Earth

==== Other uses in physics ====
- Gibbs free energy, a function of thermodynamics
- Gluon (g), a fundamental particle which mediates the strong interaction
- Shear modulus, in materials science, the ratio of shear stress to shear strain in a material

=== In scales, weights and measures ===
- G, giga-, an SI prefix meaning 10^{9} = 1,000,000,000
- g, gram, a unit of mass in the SI and CGS systems
- "g factor", or general intelligence factor, in psychometrics
- G, Birmingham gauge, used to measure the diameter of hypodermic needles

== Places ==
=== Buildings and facilities ===
- Gondia Junction railway station, Maharashtra, India (station code: G)
- Melbourne Cricket Ground in Melbourne, Australia, also known as "the 'G"

=== Populated places ===
- The United Kingdom (aircraft registration prefix G)
- Gabon (international license plate code G)
- Glasgow (UK postal code G)
- Pekalongan, Tegal, Brebes, Batang and Pemalang, Indonesia (vehicle registration prefix G)>
- Eastern Quebec (Canadian postal prefix G)

== Transit routes and services ==
- G (Los Angeles Railway)
- G (New York City Subway service), the G Brooklyn–Queens Crosstown Local, a rapid transit service
- G Line (Los Angeles Metro)
- SEPTA Route 15, a SEPTA Metro service, labeled G
- Fukuchiyama Line (official West Japan Railway Company service symbol)
- Ginza Line, a subway service operated by the Tokyo Metro, labeled

== Other uses ==
- Gangsta, in hip hop culture, the word for a person or a style
- G-man, US slang for a government agent, particularly an FBI agent
- Ground floor, particularly in elevators
- Zone G (Golf), the NATO military time zone code for UTC+07:00
- Mercedes-Benz G Class, a luxury off-roader
- G band (disambiguation)
- Dominical letter G for a common year starting on Monday
- Geraint Thomas (born 1986), Welsh professional cyclist commonly referred to as G
- Guard (gridiron football) denoted as 'G'
- Komi Sje, the Cyrillic letter Ԍ

== See also ==
- G' (disambiguation)
- G̃ (disambiguation)
- 1G (disambiguation)
- G1 (disambiguation)
- Gee (disambiguation)
- GS (disambiguation)
- GG (disambiguation)
