= Jih =

Jih or JIH may refer to:

- Jamaat-e-Islami Hind, an Islamic organisation in India
- jih, the ISO 639-3 language code for the sTodsde language, a Rgyalrongic language of China
- UL-Jih, a Czech aircraft manufacturer
- Tammy Jih, American lawyer and Amazing Race contestant
- Victor Jih, American lawyer and Amazing Race contestant

== See also ==
- G (disambiguation)
- Gee (disambiguation)
- Ghee (disambiguation)
- Gi (disambiguation)
- Ji (disambiguation)
