= Gee Creek =

Gee Creek may refer to:

- Gee Creek (Florida)
- Gee Creek (Washington)

== See also ==
- Gee Creek Wilderness, wilderness area in the U.S. state of Tennessee
