= Salmon Creek (Clark County, Washington) =

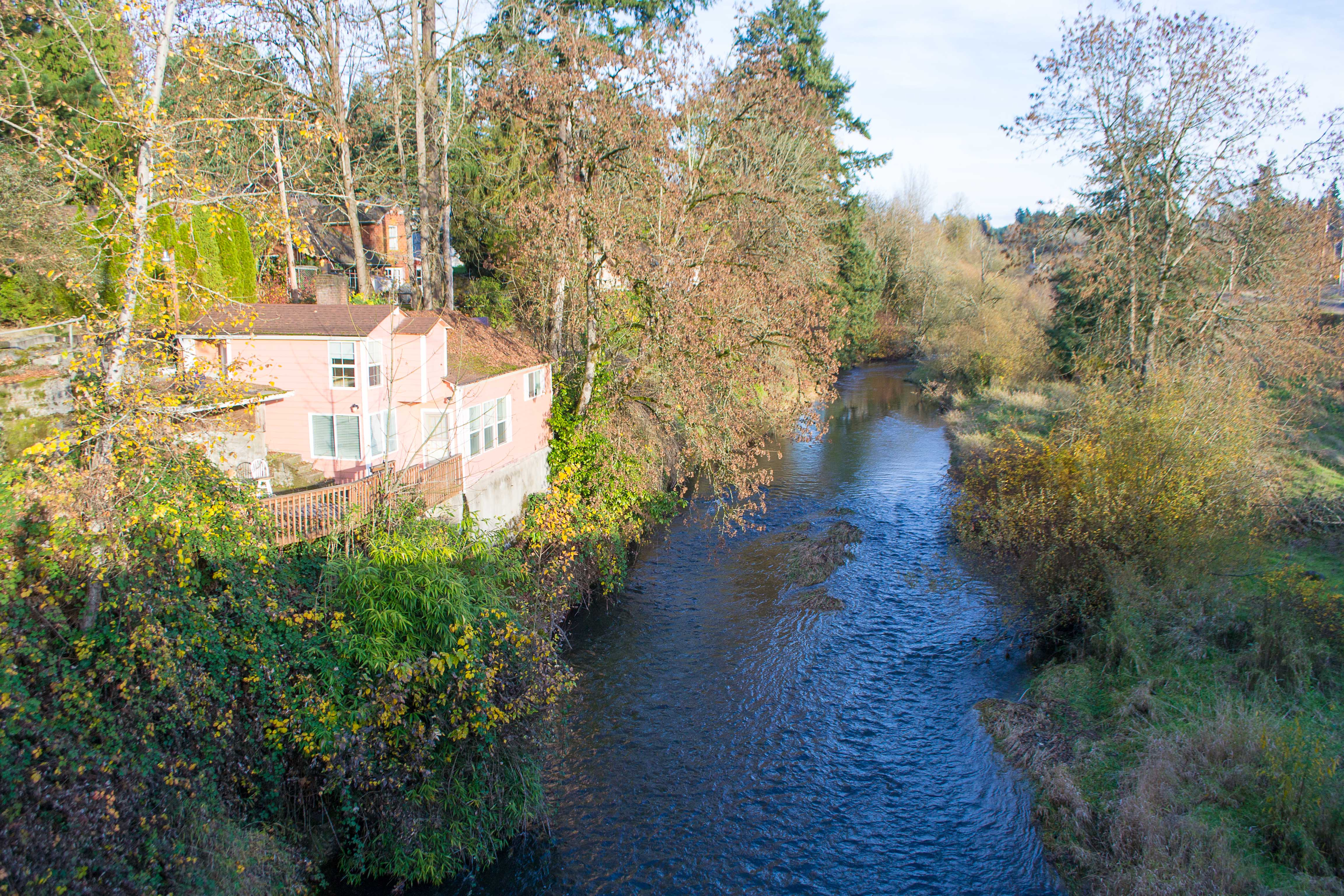

- Location of the mouth of Salmon Creek in Washington

Location
- Country: United States
- State: Washington
- County: Clark

Physical characteristics
- Source: Elkhorn Mountain
  - coordinates: 45°44′33″N 122°22′55″W
  - elevation: 1,638 ft (499 m)
- Mouth: Lake River
  - location: near Vancouver Lake
  - coordinates: 45°43′31″N 122°44′05″W
  - elevation: 10 ft (3.0 m)
- Length: 26 mi (42 km)
- Basin size: 89 sq mi (230 km^{2})

Salmon Creek is a 26-mile (42 km) tributary of Lake River in Clark County in the U.S. state of Washington. Beginning from its forested headwaters on Elkhorn Mountain, Salmon Creek passes through rural, agricultural, residential, and urban areas before flowing into the river just north of Vancouver Lake. Lake River is a tributary of the Columbia River.

Major tributaries to Salmon Creek are Mill, Woodin, Rock, Morgan, and Curtin creeks. Several smaller streams, including Curtis Creek also flow into Salmon Creek.

== Names ==
Salmon Creek is named for the salmon runs noted along the stream by early pioneers who settled in the area. The unincorporated community of Salmon Creek is named for the stream. The Salmon Creek Wastewater Treatment Plant is along the banks of lower Salmon Creek.

== Watershed ==
Salmon Creek drains 89 square miles (230 km^{2}) of land that is least developed near the headwaters and increasingly developed further downstream. About 29 percent of the watershed is forested; 38 percent is devoted to fields, pastures, bare earth, and shrubland, and 33 percent has been developed for urban use.

The water quality of surface streams in the basin range from "good" in the forested areas to "very poor" in developed areas downstream. Harmful bacteria levels and high turbidity are the two most serious problems. Despite this, steelhead, coho salmon, and coastal cutthroat trout use about 43 miles (69 km) of the basin's streams.

== Bridge replacement ==
Klineline Bridge carrying Highway 99 over Salmon Creek was first built in 1927 and open to traffic in 1928, after replaced from the old Klineline Bridge (also known as "Marble bridge") was located few feet east of the current bridge (Klineline Bridge). After the creek eroded the bridge supports and part of the bridge collapsed in 1956, rebuilt it in 1956 or 1957, it closed on December 2, 2007 while a new bridge was built. Ostrander Rock and Construction of Longview won the construction contract with a bid that included completing the bridge within 160 days from start to finish. Work started on April 19, 2008 and completed on September 19, 2008, a week earlier than the contract deadline. The new span has four travel lanes, a center median divider island, bicycle lanes, curb/gutter, sidewalks and two pedestrian overlooks with views of Salmon Creek. The county restored more than 650 feet (200 m) of stream channel west of the bridge, which has improved salmon and steelhead passage.

== Recreation ==
Klineline Pond and East Lake, (which started out as gravel pits) and Battle Ground Lake are the only two lakes in the watershed that are larger than 5 acres (2 ha). Salmon Creek Park at the pond offers picnicking, fishing, swimming, and hiking opportunities. The Salmon Creek Greenway Trail follows the creek for about 3 miles (5 km) between the pond and Felida Bridge. Connecting trails include Cougar Creek Trail and a trail between Klineline Pond and East Lake, east of Interstate 5.

Battle Ground Lake State Park, is a 280-acre (110 ha) camping park in the forest near the city of Battle Ground, east of Vancouver. Amenities at the park include picnic sites, trails, cabins, as well as fishing and a boat launch on 28-acre (11 ha) Battle Ground Lake.

== See also ==
- List of rivers of Washington (state)
- List of tributaries of the Columbia River
