= Vancouver Lake =

Lake in Clark County, Washington, United States

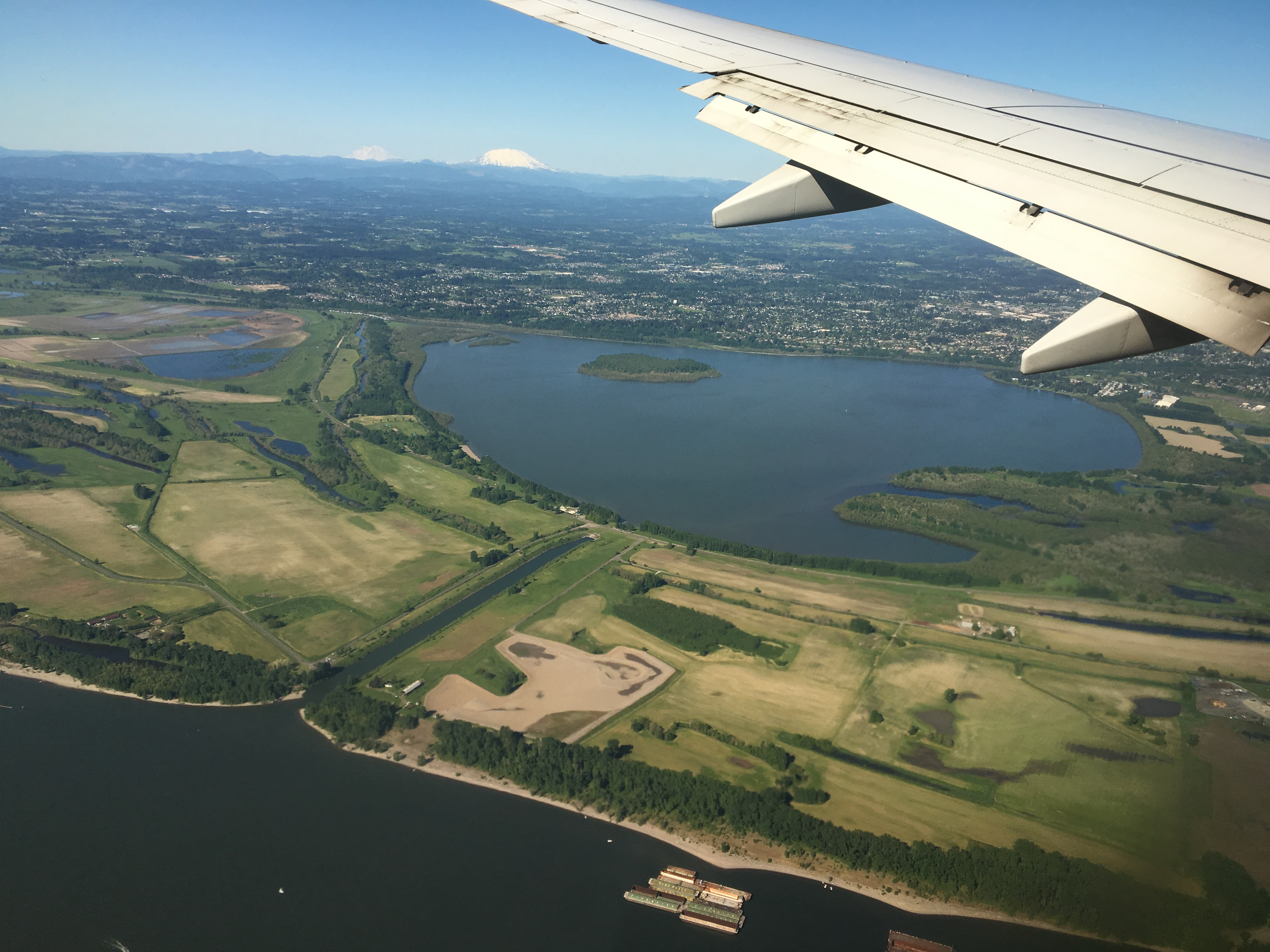
- An aerial view of the lake (with the Columbia River in the foreground)

- Location within Washington (state)
- Location: Clark County, Washington
- Coordinates: 45.6779°N 122.721°W
- Primary inflows: Columbia River (intermittent) and Burnt Bridge Creek (continuous)
- Primary outflows: Lake River (intermittent)
- Catchment area: Vancouver Lake/Lake River, Lakeshore, Burnt Bridge Creek, Salmon Creek, Whipple Creek, Flume Creek
- Basin countries: United States
- Max. width: > 2 mi (3.2 km)
- Surface area: approx. 2,400 acres (9.7 km^{2})
- Average depth: < 3 ft (0.9 m)
- Max. depth: 12 to 15 feet (3.7 to 4.6 m)
- Shore length^{1}: > 7 mi (11 km)
- Islands: 1
- ^{1} Shore length is not a well-defined measure.

Vancouver Lake is located just west of Vancouver, Washington, United States, north of the Columbia River and Portland, Oregon, south of Ridgefield, Washington, and the Ridgefield National Wildlife Refuge.

The lake is shallow, with a maximum depth of 12 to 15 feet (3.7 to 4.6 m) and a mean depth of less than 3 feet (0.9 m). There is an island in the northern half of the lake named Turtle Island. The island was formed from the tailings of an Army Corps of Engineers dredging project, which dredged around the perimeter of the lake in the early 1980s. Lake River flows from the north shore to the Columbia River near Ridgefield. Due to seasonal variation in relative river and lake levels, Lake River experiences intermittent flow reversal and flows into Vancouver Lake for considerable periods of time.

The sources for Vancouver Lake's water include a flushing channel (equipped with tidal gates to control flows) from the Columbia River near the southwest shoreline and Burnt Bridge Creek on the eastern shoreline, which winds about ten miles (sixteen kilometres) through many of the city's residential areas. Until the 1980s, this creek was neglected and a major source of pollution for the lake.

Lower River Road leads west out of Vancouver to a park on the shore of Vancouver Lake which includes a large swimming area. A trail leads to Frenchman's Bar Park on the nearby Columbia River.

== Natural history ==
A study published in 2014 by Curt D.Peterson, et al, PSU Dept of Geology, includes results from multiple core samples which demonstrate there's been a lake in this location continuously going back at least 4000 years.

Vancouver Lake is home to a variety of wildlife species, many of which it shares with the nearby Ridgefield National Wildlife Refuge. Descriptions from the late 19th century describe Vancouver Lake as clear, up to 20 ft (6.1 m) deep and containing sturgeon. Current turbidity, more shallow depths and a lack of aquatic plant structures have diminished the variety of species and more recent surveys showed the most abundant fish by mass were brown bullhead, white crappie, black crappie, and common carp, with a few juvenile salmonids and a population of channel catfish, largemouth bass, bluegill, pumpkinseed, yellow perch, naturalized goldfish, northern pikeminnow, American shad, mosquito fish, largescale sucker, and freshwater sculpin. Rich fringe environments provide habitat for amphibians such as tree frogs, reptiles such as garter snakes and a wide variety of birds, including large species such as great blue herons, osprey and bald eagles. It is within the Pacific Flyway. Large mammals on its banks include raccoons, a few black-tailed deer and an occasional coyote.

== History ==
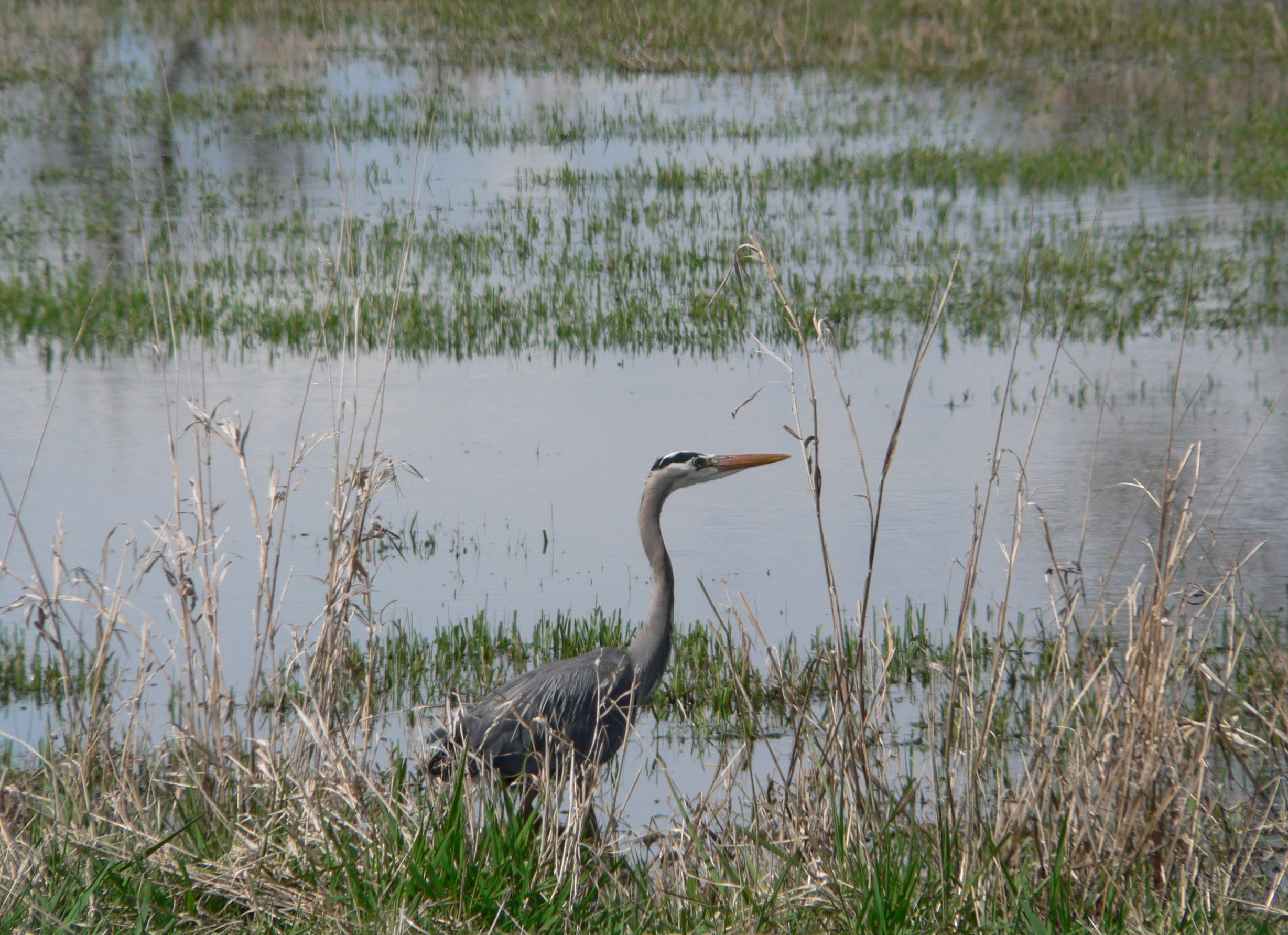
Wetlands are vital to wildlife such as this great blue heron.

Vancouver Lake was referenced in Lewis and Clark's journal entries from November 4, 1805.

Shortly after the lake was deeded to the Port of Vancouver, Washington, in 1919, agricultural interests proposed draining it, (A smaller lake to the north, Shillapoo Lake, was drained and used for agriculture) but by the end of the 1920s, recreational uses were also considered. Because of cold weather, the lake was frozen solid to "several inches" in depth on February 10, 1929, and was home to 500 ice skaters one weekend. The lake was briefly considered as a decommissioning harbor in 1945, but after the Memorial Day flood of 1948 was also seen as a possible resource in flood control.

Suburbanization of its watershed area led to an increase in water pollution. Surface runoff brought increased sediment while residential drain fields and increased use of fertilizers rich in nitrogen and phosphorus contributed to eutrophication. DDT was also used for mosquito control until its effects on fish and birds became apparent, and the county discontinued it. A 2005 report showed higher than normal levels of various contaminants in the lake's fish.

Since then, there have been various interests in the area as it relates to habitat preservation, recreation and industry, culminating in the "Habitek" plan of the mid-1980s and the multi-agency Burnt Bridge Creek Watershed Plan of 1995. Algal bloom has been an intermittent problem for recreational use of the lake (officially recognized by the county in 2003) since cyanobacteria such as Anabaena, Microcystis aeruginosa and Cylindrospermopsin raciborskii may produce neurotoxins such as cylindrospermopsin.

The Vancouver Lake Watershed Partnership was formed in October 2004, bringing various public agencies with interest and jurisdiction together.

Vancouver Lake plays host to two water sport oriented recreation clubs. Vancouver Lake Crew is a high school and master aged rowing club that uses the lake as its primary practice facility. Along with rowing, kayaking, canoeing, and dragon boating are also popular activities hosted by Vancouver Lake Crew. On the opposite East shore sits the Vancouver Lake Sailing Club, where sailboats can be launched, with opportunities for sailing education and racing.

In 2017, lake users noticed an increasing level of Eurasian Water Milfoil (EWM) in the lake. In late 2018, concerned citizens joined forces with local and state agencies to assess the EWM infestation. In early 2019, local volunteers formed a 501c(3) non-profit, Friends of Vancouver Lake. Working with the Vancouver Lake Crew, Vancouver Lake Sailing Club, and hundreds of concerned community members, they secured a Washington State permit to treat the lake with a newly-approved herbicide, ProcellaCOR. This fast-acting herbicide is targeted to EWM, but non-toxic to humans, fish, and wildlife. While environmental conditions prevented a treatment in 2019, Vancouver Lake and its flushing channel were treated with ProcellaCOR July 7, 2020. Post-treatment surveys several weeks later showed no trace of EWM in the lake or flushing channel.

== See also ==
- List of lakes in Washington
