= Curtis Lake =

Curtis Lake may refer to:

- Curtis Lake (Alcona County, Michigan), a lake in Alcona County, Michigan
- Curtis Lake, a lake in Lincoln County, Minnesota
- Curtis Lake, a lake in Yellow Medicine County, Minnesota
- Curtis Lake (Clark County, Washington), a lake in Clark County, Washington
- Curtis Lake (Virginia), a lake in Stafford County, Virginia
