= Bachelor Island (Washington) =

Coordinates: 45°49′15″N 122°46′35″W

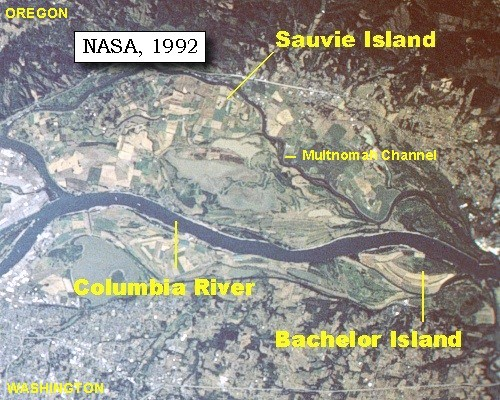
Map from satellite image looking south at Sauvie Island and Bachelor Island

Bachelor Island is an island in the U.S. state of Washington. It is located in the Columbia River near Ridgefield, just south of the mouth of the Lewis River and a few miles north of the mouth of the Willamette River. The island stretches from Columbia river mile 88 to 91.5 (142 to 147 km). The northern end of Sauvie Island lies across the Columbia from Bachelor Island.

Bachelor Island is separated from the mainland by Bachelor Island Slough and Lake River. Bachelor Island Slough separates from the Columbia River at Bachelor Point and the southern end of Bachelor Island. The slough joins Lake River, which empties into the Columbia River at the northern end of Bachelor Island.

Most of Bachelor Island is part of the Ridgefield National Wildlife Refuge.

== History ==
Lewis and Clark first called the island "Green Bryor Isd," when they passed it while travelling downriver in 1805. They changed the name to "Quathlahpotle Island" in 1806, during their return voyage upriver. The name honored a large village, "Quathlahpotle", of 14 wooden houses and 900 inhabitants on the mainland nearby.

In 1841 Charles Wilkes of the United States Exploring Expedition named the island "Pasainks Island". Bachelor Island Slough he called "Piscou Creek". It was sometimes called Columbia Island during the 19th century.

In 1849 or 1850 three bachelors took donation claims and settled on the island, giving rise to its present name, Bachelor Island.
