= Basalt Cobblestone Quarries District =

- U.S. National Register of Historic Places
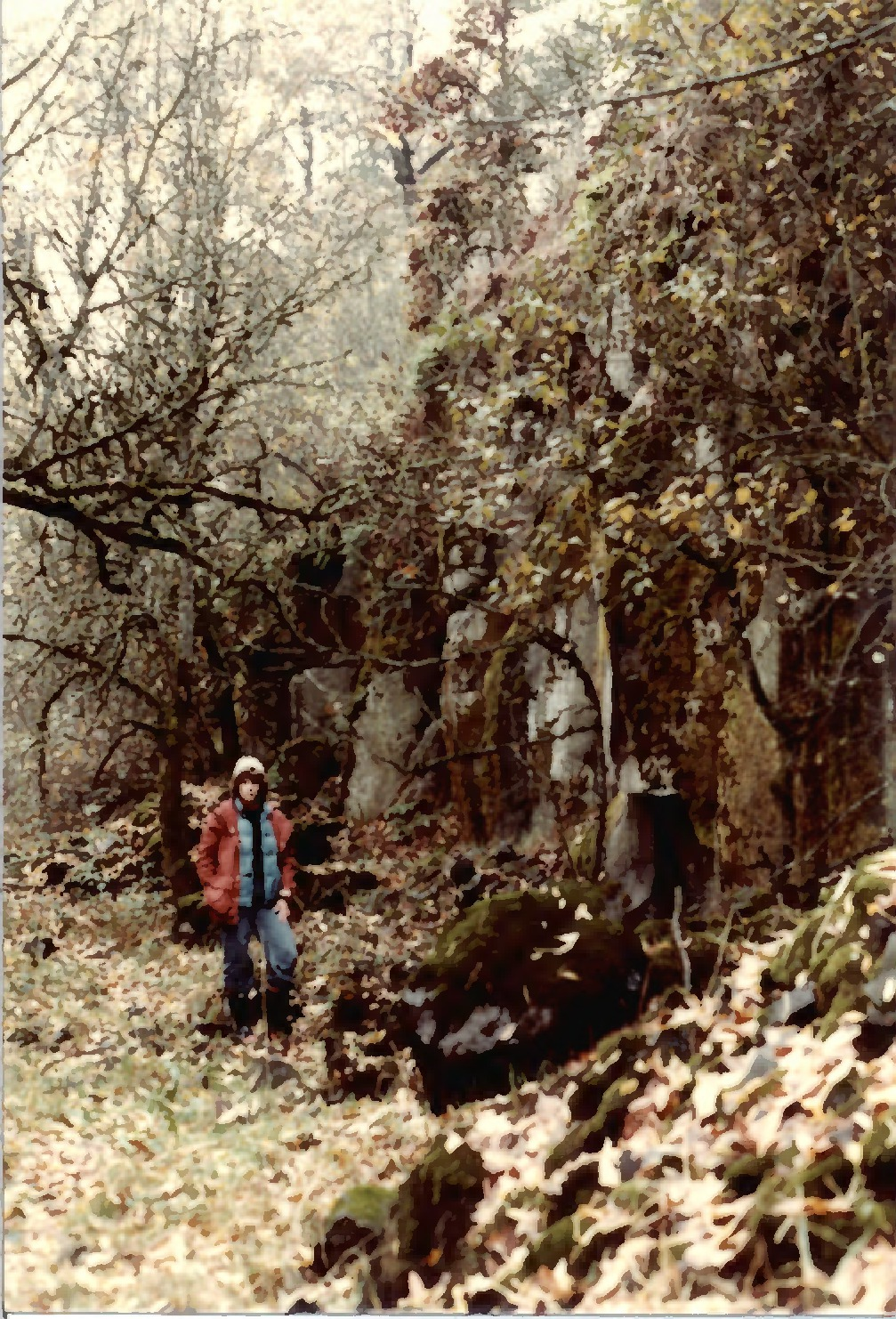
- Basalt quarry on south bank of Gee Creek. Depicted individual is unidentified. Basalt Cobblestone Quarries District, Ridgefield National Wildlife Refuge, Ridgefield, Washington, United States.
- Nearest city: Ridgefield, Washington
- Area: 535 acres (2.17 km^{2})
- NRHP reference No.: 81000587
- Added to NRHP: December 14, 1981

The Basalt Cobblestone Quarries District, in Clark County, Washington near Ridgefield, is a 535 acres (2.17 km^{2}) area which was listed on the National Register of Historic Places in 1981. It included seven contributing sites: seven separate quarries.

It is located in the Carty Unit of the Ridgefield National Wildlife Refuge.
