= Ridgefield Veterans Memorial =

Memorial in Ridgefield, Washington, US

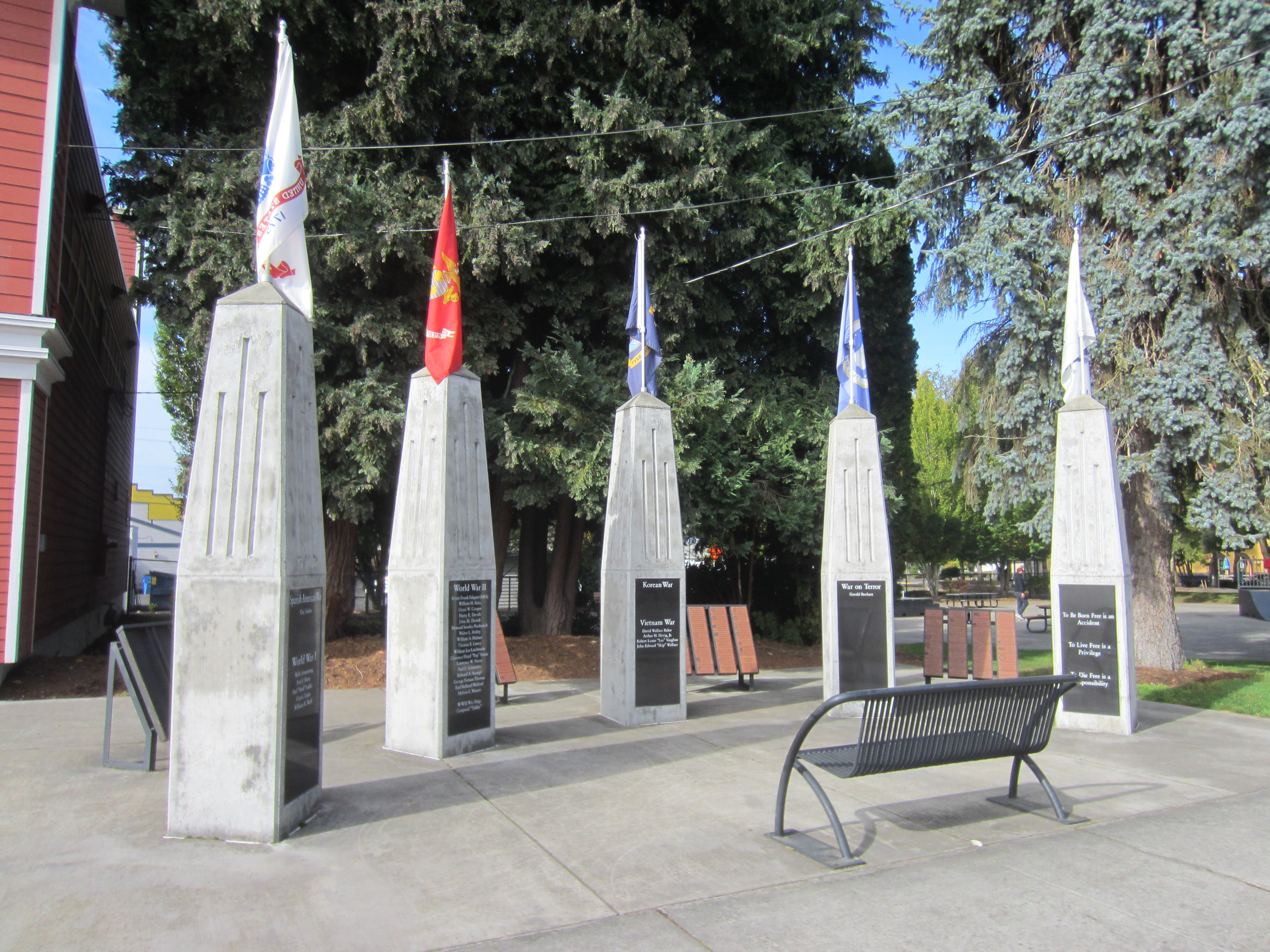
- The memorial in 2020
- Interactive map of Ridgefield Veterans Memorial
- Location: Ridgefield, Washington, United States
- Coordinates: 45°48′57″N 122°44′43″W

Ridgefield Veterans Memorial is a memorial in Ridgefield, Washington, commemorating locals who died in wars since the Spanish–American War. The memorial features five 10.5-foot (3.2 m) columns, each topped with a flag representing one of the military service branches, was dedicated in November 2012. Approximately 250 people attended the dedication ceremony. This is adjacent to Community Park.
