= GHI =

GHI may refer to:

- Gardens for Health International, an American philanthropic organization
- Gatwick Handling, a British aircraft ground handling agent
- GeoHazards International, an American disaster preparedness organization
- German Historical Institutes
- Ghee, clarified butter
- Ghost Hunters International, an American television series
- Global Health Initiatives
- Global Horizontal Irradiance, the total solar radiation incident on a horizontal surface
- Global Hunger Index
- Greenbelt Homes, Inc., an American housing cooperative
- Group Health Incorporated, an American health insurance company
- Guitar Hero (video game)

== See also ==
- Ghee (disambiguation)
