= Gee Creek (Washington) =

Creek in Clark County, Washington, US

Coordinates: 45°47′43″N 122°41′20″W

- Etymology: named for William Gee

Location
- Country: United States
- State: Washington (state)
- Region: Clark County, Washington
- Municipality: Ridgefield, Washington

Gee Creek is a 4th order tributary to the Columbia River, a.k.a. small creek, within Clark County, Washington named for William Gee, an early pioneer upon whose land the stream arose from. The Upper Gee Creek watershed, with an 8.7-square-mile (23 km^{2}) drainage basin, is completely located within the Ridgefield quadrangle. The mainstem extends approximately 11.5 miles (18.5 km), of which 4.9 miles (7.9 km) are located within the Upper Gee Creek basin. Originating in the hills along Interstate 5, through Ridgefield, Washington and empties into a series of lakes on the Columbia River Floodplain. Abrams Park in Ridgefield is a local access point for Gee Creek and since 2003, has had a stream flow gauge installed to collect hydrological data. The lowest segment of Gee Creek meanders for 3 miles (4.8 km) through the Ridgefield National Wildlife Refuge.

In the spring of 2006, the United States Fish and Wildlife Service and WSU Clark County Extension initiated the Gee Creek Watershed Restoration project, a joint effort to provide new funding to support and expand watershed enhancement efforts in partnership with the Gee Creek Enhancement Committee, Friends of Ridgefield National Wildlife Refuge, the Lower Columbia River Estuary Partnership, the City of Ridgefield, area schools, and local residents. Federal, state, and county agencies provided advice and assistance. Currently, additional funding sources are being sought to sustain watershed restoration work in the years ahead. The Gee Creek project ended in December 2009.

The upper portion of the watershed is currently rural-residential, but is bisected by I-5 and associated industrial development while the lower portion flows through the rapidly expanding City of Ridgefield. Recent data shows Gee Creek has poor stream health, most likely due to runoff from agricultural, developed, and residential areas. Over the past 160 years, the entire length of the creek has been subject to the combined effects of farming and urbanization. Accelerating growth will continue to change conditions in the watershed.

== Name usage ==
The creek lends its name to the I-5N and I-5S Gee Creek Safety Rest Area in Clark County, the Gee Creek Exploration Trail in the Ridgefield National Wildlife Refuge as well as the regionally popular Gee Creek Farm which operates just outside Ridgefield using organic and other environmentally efficient farming techniques.
