= Lake River =

- Location of the mouth of Lake River in Washington Lake River (the United States)

Location
- Country: United States
- State: Washington
- County: Clark

Physical characteristics
- Source: Vancouver Lake
  - location: Vancouver
  - coordinates: 45°41′53″N 122°43′05″W
  - elevation: 8 ft (2.4 m)
- Mouth: Columbia River
  - location: near Ridgefield
  - coordinates: 45°50′37″N 122°46′50″W
  - elevation: 7 ft (2.1 m)
- Length: 11 mi (18 km)
- Basin size: 100 sq mi (260 km^{2})

Lake River is a tributary, about 11 miles (18 km) long, of the Columbia River in the U.S. state of Washington. It flows north from Vancouver Lake in Vancouver to meet the larger river near Ridgefield and the northern tip of Bachelor Island. The Wilkes Expedition of 1841 referred to Lake River as Calipaya Inlet.

The river is part of the 32-mile (51 km) Lewis River – Vancouver Lake Water Trail linking Vancouver Lake to Woodland by waters suitable for kayaks and other boats. Portions of the Ridgefield National Wildlife Refuge border the river.

== Course ==
Lake River, a "slow, flat slough of the Columbia River", loses only 1 foot (30 cm) in elevation over its entire 11-mile (18 km) course. It flows north, roughly parallel to the Columbia until curving slightly northwest to join it. At times, tidal fluctuations and high flows along the Columbia cause Lake River to flow backwards into the lake, sometimes for long periods.

Flowing out of the lake and Vancouver Lake Park, the river receives Buckmire Slough from the left. Beyond the confluence, Shillapoo Wildlife Area is to the left, and the unincorporated community of Felida is to the right. About 1.5 miles (2.4 km) further downstream, Salmon Creek enters from the right.

Over the next 0.5 miles (0.8 km), the river passes between Curtis Lake on the right and Round Lake on the left. About 8 miles (13 km) from the mouth, Lake River enters Ridgefield National Wildlife Refuge and passes between Green Lake on the right and Post Office Lake on the left. Whipple Creek enters from the right at RM 7 (RK 11). Over the next 2 miles (3 km), Campbell Lake is on the left. Flume Creek enters from the right about 4.5 miles (7.2 km) from the mouth.

The river exits the wildlife refuge, and about 3 miles (5 km) from the mouth, the stream curves to the northwest and enters Ridgefield, which is on the right. A mile or so later, Bachelor Island Slough enters from the left, and Carty Lake is on the right as the stream re-enters the wildlife refuge. Lake River enters the Columbia River at the north tip of Bachelor Island, about 0.5 miles (0.8 km) upstream of the mouth of the Lewis River and about 87.5 miles (140.8 km) from the Columbia's mouth on the Pacific Ocean.

== Watershed and water quality ==
Lake River drains more than 100 square miles (260 km^{2}). The watershed includes the mostly urban 28-square-mile (73 km^{2}) catchment of Burnt Bridge Creek, which empties into Vancouver Lake. Also parts of the watershed are the lake and its surrounds, land along the main stem, and the urban, suburban, rural lands along tributary streams, principally Salmon, Whipple, and Flume creeks. The water quality of all these water bodies is relatively poor.

== See also ==
- List of rivers of Washington (state)
- List of tributaries of the Columbia River
