= Burnt Bridge Creek =

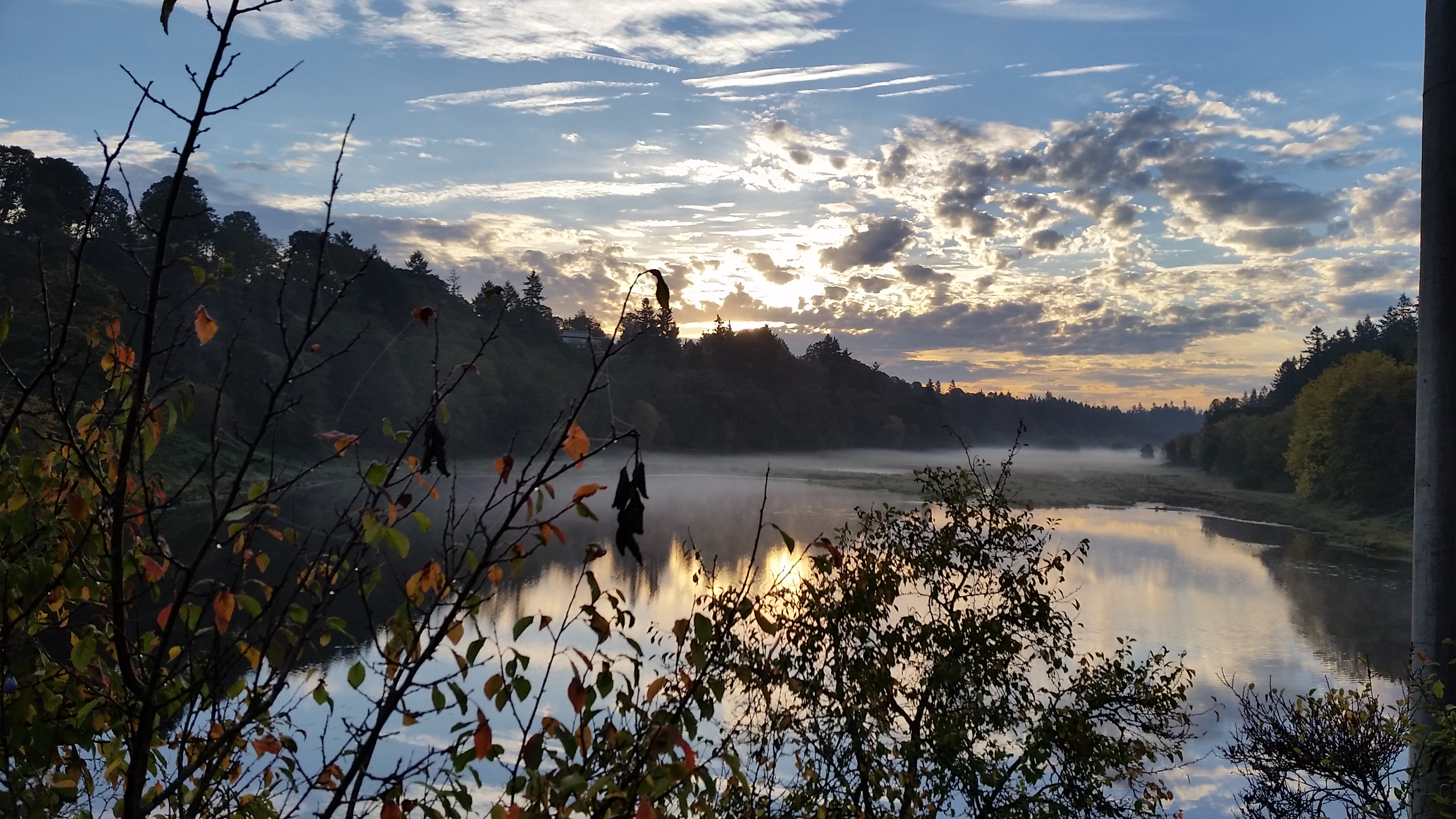
- Burnt Bridge Creek on an autumn morning

- Location of the mouth of Burnt Bridge Creek in Washington Burnt Bridge Creek (the United States)

Location
- Country: United States
- State: Washington (state)
- County: Clark

Physical characteristics
- Source: Field ditches east of Vancouver, Washington
  - location: near Orchards
  - coordinates: 45°39′37″N 122°30′30″W
  - elevation: 201 ft (61 m)
- Mouth: Vancouver Lake
  - location: Vancouver
  - coordinates: 45°40′29″N 122°41′34″W
  - elevation: 16 ft (4.9 m)
- Length: 13 km (8.1 mi)
- Basin size: 28 sq mi (73 km^{2})

Burnt Bridge Creek is a 13-mile (21 km) stream flowing for most of its length within the city of Vancouver in the U.S. state of Washington. It begins as drainage from field ditches near the unincorporated community of Orchards, east of the city. The creek flows generally west to Vancouver Lake. The lake drains to Lake River, which empties into the Columbia River about 11 miles (18 km) downstream of the city.

For its first 8 miles (13 km), the creek follows a combination of natural and artificial channels, then continues along a small canyon for the rest of its course. The creek receives water from Cold Creek, its largest tributary, as well as Peterson Creek, Burton Channel, and an unnamed stream.

== Watershed and water quality ==
Burnt Bridge Creek drains 28 square miles (73 km^{2}) of mostly urban land. Only 4 percent of the basin is forested, whereas 23 percent is devoted to fields, pastures, and shrubland, and 73 percent has been developed for urban use.

The water quality of surface streams in the basin range from "poor" to "very poor". Burnt Bridge Creek does not meet the Washington Department of Ecology standards for fecal coliform bacteria, temperature, acidity, and levels of dissolved oxygen. Despite the degraded habitat, the lowermost part of the creek supports coho salmon, rainbow trout and steelhead.

== Recreation ==
The 8-mile (13 km) mixed-use Burnt Bridge Creek Greenway Trail runs along the creek through the middle of Vancouver. The hard-surface path is used for walking, biking, and jogging, and offers opportunities for wildlife viewing. The trail begins at Stewart Glen, a city park, and passes through Leverich Park, another city park. Both parks have picnic areas, restrooms, and other amenities.

== See also ==
- List of rivers of Washington (state)
