= Julia Butler Hansen Refuge for the Columbian White-Tailed Deer =

Wildlife refuge in southwestern Washington and northwestern Oregon, US

- IUCN category IV (habitat/species management area)
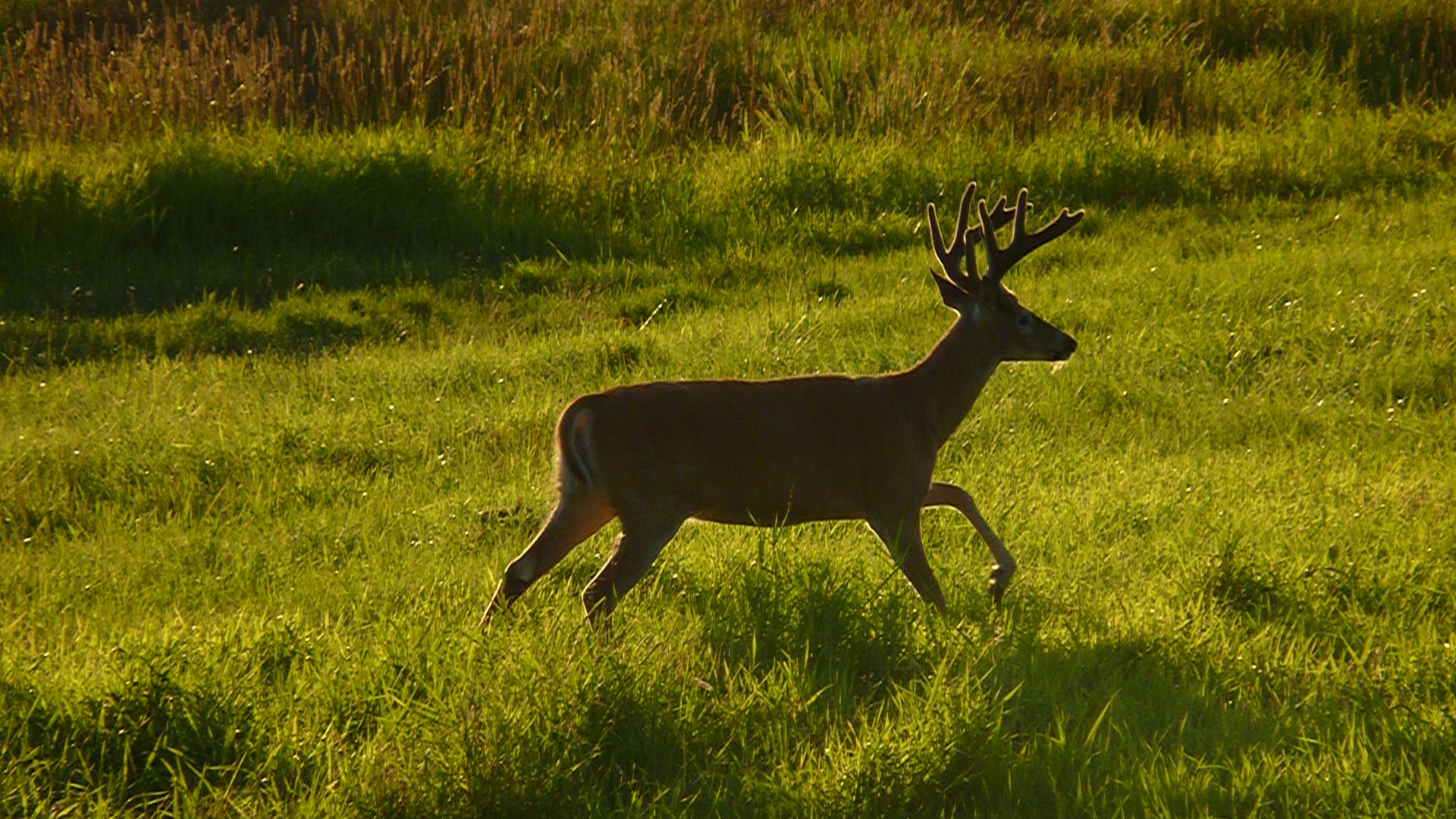

- Location within Washington (state) Location within the United States
- Location: Clatsop, Columbia counties, Oregon, Wahkiakum County, Washington, United States
- Nearest city: Cathlamet, Washington
- Coordinates: 46°14′50″N 123°24′49″W
- Area: 5,600 acres (23 km^{2})
- Established: 1972
- Named for: Julia Butler Hansen
- Governing body: U.S. Fish and Wildlife Service
- Website: Julia Butler Hansen Refuge

The Julia Butler Hansen Refuge for the Columbian White-Tailed Deer is a wildlife refuge located in southwestern Washington and northwestern Oregon, United States. It was established in 1972 specifically to protect and manage the endangered Columbian white-tailed deer. The refuge contains over 5,600 acres (23 km^{2}) of pastures, forested tidal swamps, brushy woodlots, marshes, and sloughs along the Columbia River in both Washington and Oregon.

== Etymology and history ==
The refuge is named for Julia Butler Hansen, a former member of the United States House of Representatives for Washington state. Originally named the Columbian White-Tailed Deer Refuge, the name was changed in 1990.

The refuge was specifically created to provide a protected habitat for endangered Columbian white-tailed deer. By 2015, the deer population in the Lower Columbia River region, which includes Julia Butler Hansen and the Ridgefield National Wildlife Refuge, had doubled to 900, allowing the species to receive a recommendation to be reclassified as threatened. In April, 2012, a dike that keeps the Columbia River from flooding the Julia Butler Hansen Refuge collapsed during high river flow levels. The potential flood was considered a threat to the resident population of Columbian white-tailed deer. A large portion of the deer population at the Ridgefield site is due to a relocation of deer from Julia Butler Hansen during the flood concerns.

== Habitat ==
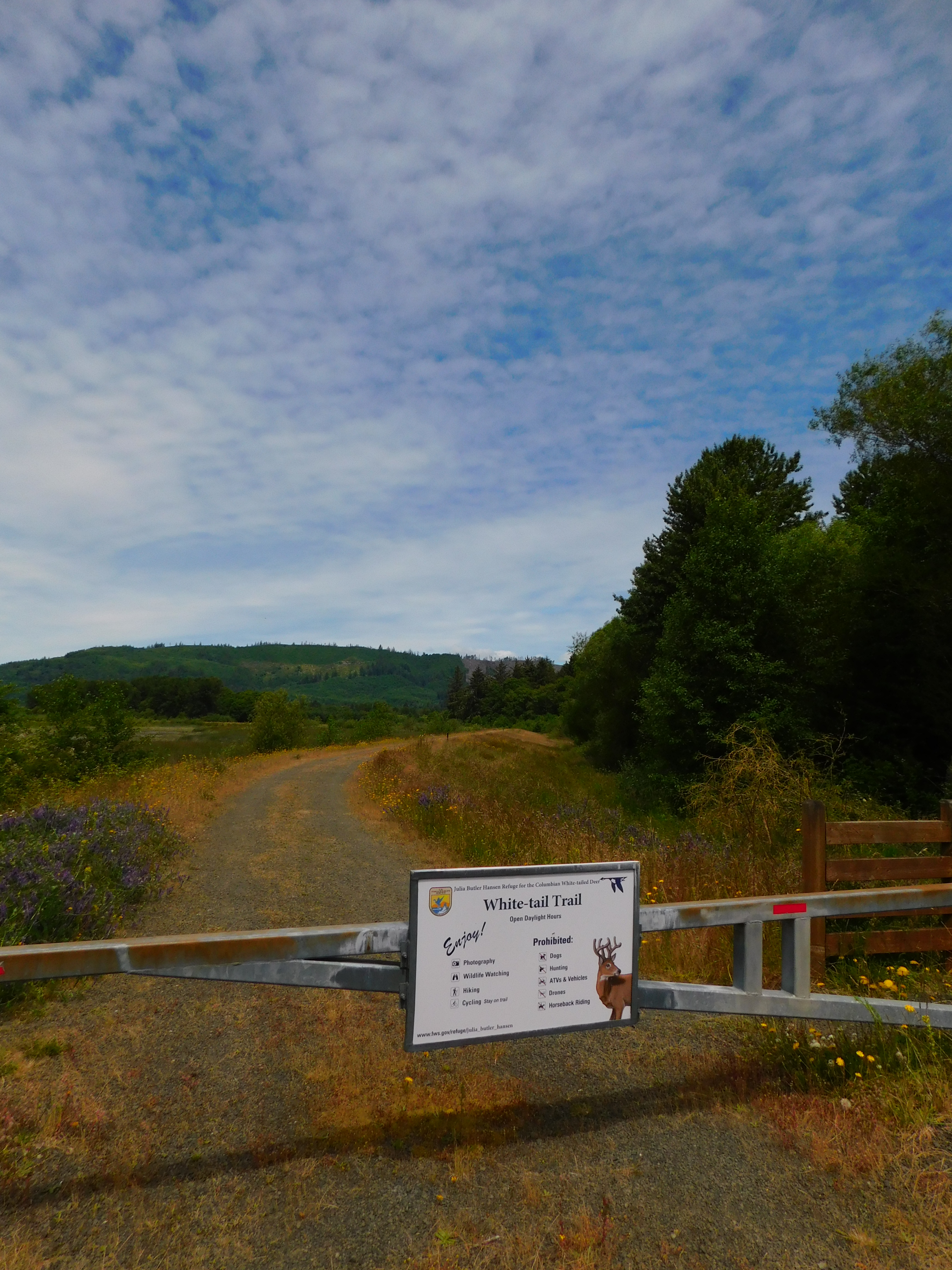
White-tail trail at the refuge

Columbian white-tailed-deer running

The valuable habitat the refuge preserves for the deer also benefits a large variety of wintering birds, a small herd of Roosevelt elk, river otter, various reptiles and amphibians including painted turtles and red-legged frogs, and several pairs of nesting bald eagles and osprey.

Approximately 300 Columbian white-tailed deer live on the refuge per the last count. Another 300-400 deer live on private lands along the river. The areas upstream from the refuge on Puget Island and on the Oregon side of the river are vital to reestablishing and maintaining viable populations of the species. The refuge works with private and corporate landowners to maintain and reestablish deer on their lands.
