= Overlook Park (Ridgefield, Washington) =

Public park in Ridgefield, Washington, U.S.

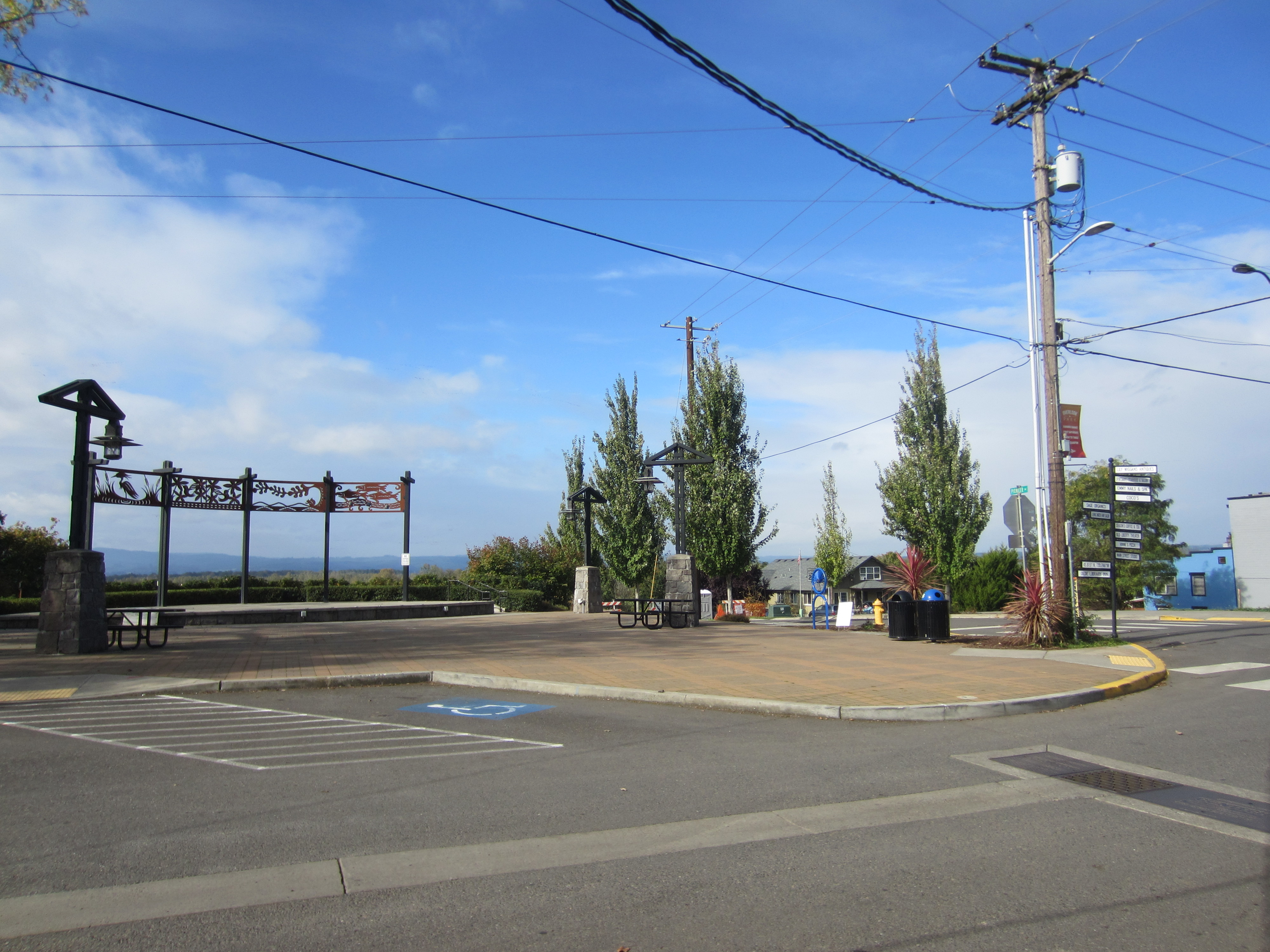
- The park in 2020

- Location within Washington (state)
- Location: Ridgefield, Washington, United States
- Coordinates: 45°48′54″N 122°44′47″W

Overlook Park is a public park in Ridgefield, Washington, United States. The park features an amphitheater, a brick plaza, public restrooms, and historical information.
