= Davis Park (Ridgefield, Washington) =

Public park in Ridgefield, Washington, United States

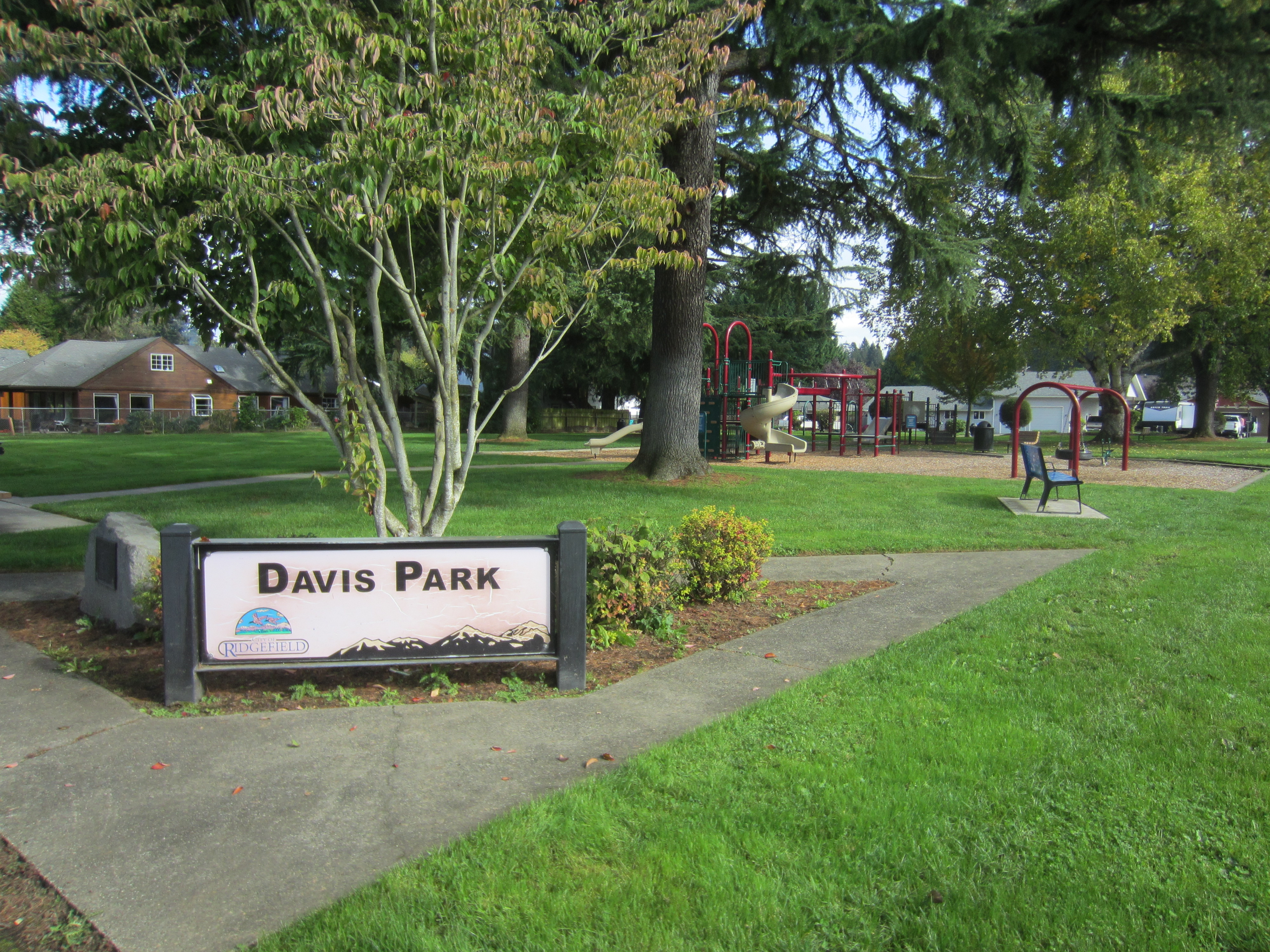
- The park in 2020

- Location within Washington (state)
- Location: Ridgefield, Washington, United States
- Coordinates: 45°49′03″N 122°44′45″W

Davis Park is a public park in Ridgefield, Washington, United States. The park features a playground, a large grassy area, and picnic tables.
