= Ridgefield National Wildlife Refuge =

Wildlife refuge in Washington, U.S.

- IUCN category IV (habitat/species management area)
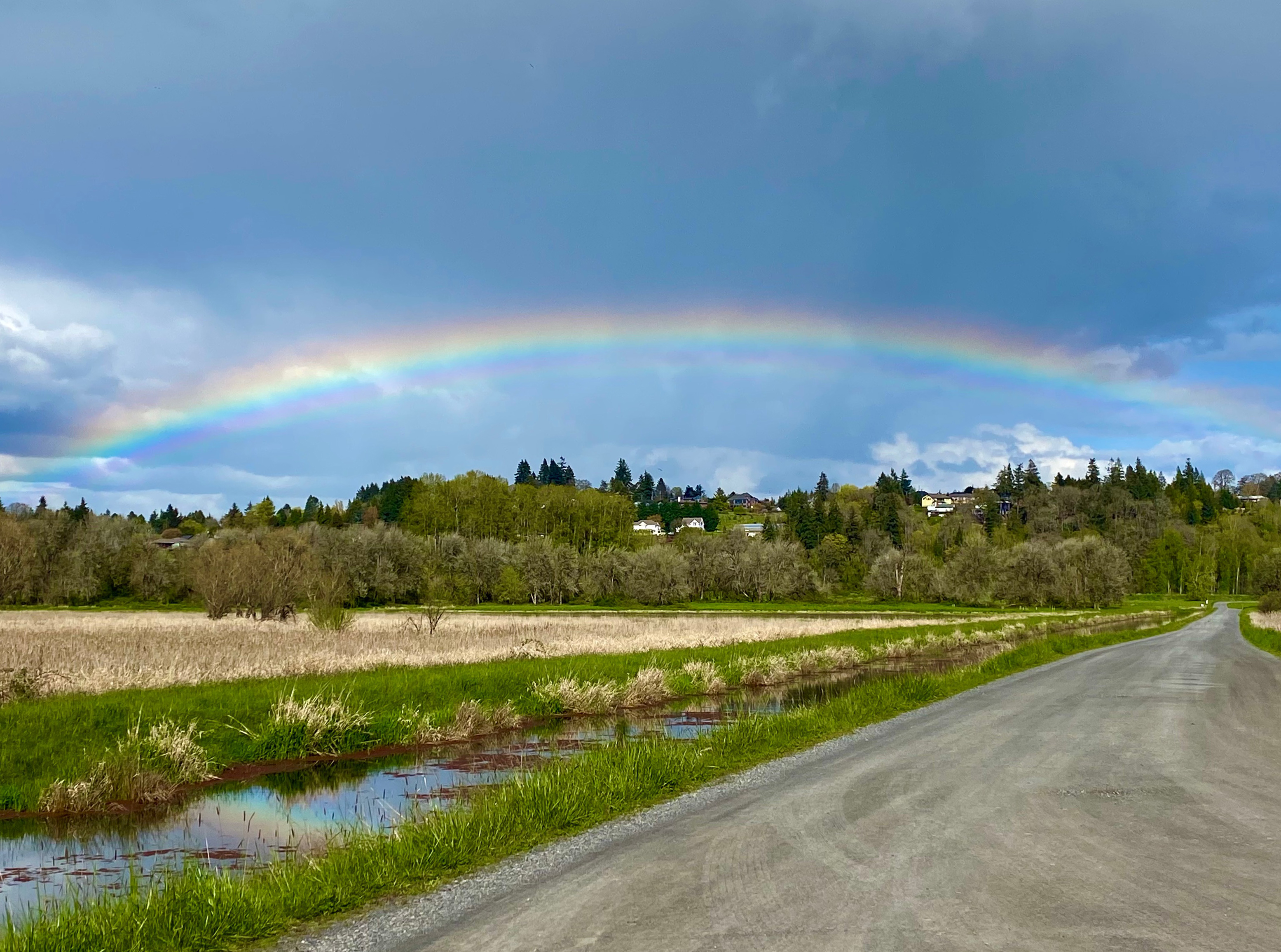
- Ridgefield National Wildlife Refuge, 2022

- Location within Washington (state)
- Location: Clark County, Washington, United States
- Nearest city: Ridgefield, Washington
- Coordinates: 45°48′15″N 122°45′42″W
- Area: 5,228.10 acres (21.1574 km^{2})
- Established: 1965
- Visitors: 165,000
- Governing body: United States Fish and Wildlife Service
- Website: Ridgefield National Wildlife Refuge

Ridgefield National Wildlife Refuge is a National Wildlife Refuge and is overseen by the United States Fish and Wildlife Service. The refuge borders the Columbia River and is located west of the city of Ridgefield, Washington. The wildlife haven is split by Lake River. The refuge, which provides a year-round habitat and a migration stop for a variety of bird species, protects more than 5,200 acres (2,100 ha) of marshes, grasslands, and woodlands

== History ==
The refuge was established (along with 3 other refuges in the Willamette Valley of Oregon) in 1965, in response to a need to establish vital winter habitat for wintering waterfowl with an emphasis on the dusky Canada goose whose nesting areas in Alaska were severely impacted by the violent earthquake of 1964. A three-year relocation effort to move approximately 50 Columbian white-tailed deer by helicopter to the refuge from the Julia Butler Hansen Refuge for the Columbian White-Tailed Deer occurred beginning in 2012 after the species was considered to be in danger after a dike was found to be in a state of imminent collapse caused during high water flow on the Columbia River that year.

Ridgefield NWR is part of the Ridgefield National Wildlife Refuge Complex, headquartered in Ridgefield, Washington, which oversees the management of four refuges in the southwestern part of the state: Ridgefield, and three refuges in the Columbia River Gorge: Franz Lake, Pierce, and Steigerwald Lake. The headquarters were closed in spring of 2019 to cut down Douglas fir and change the trail.

In the fall of 2020, the construction of a new multi-purpose building began. The refuge's Community Nature Center at the Carty Unit was opened in May 2026 during a dedication that featured songs and spiritual ceremonies by members of the Cowlitz Indian Tribe. With a main focus on being used as an educational facility, the center is also to be a "welcoming gateway to nature". The center features interpretive displays, a classroom, and meeting spaces.

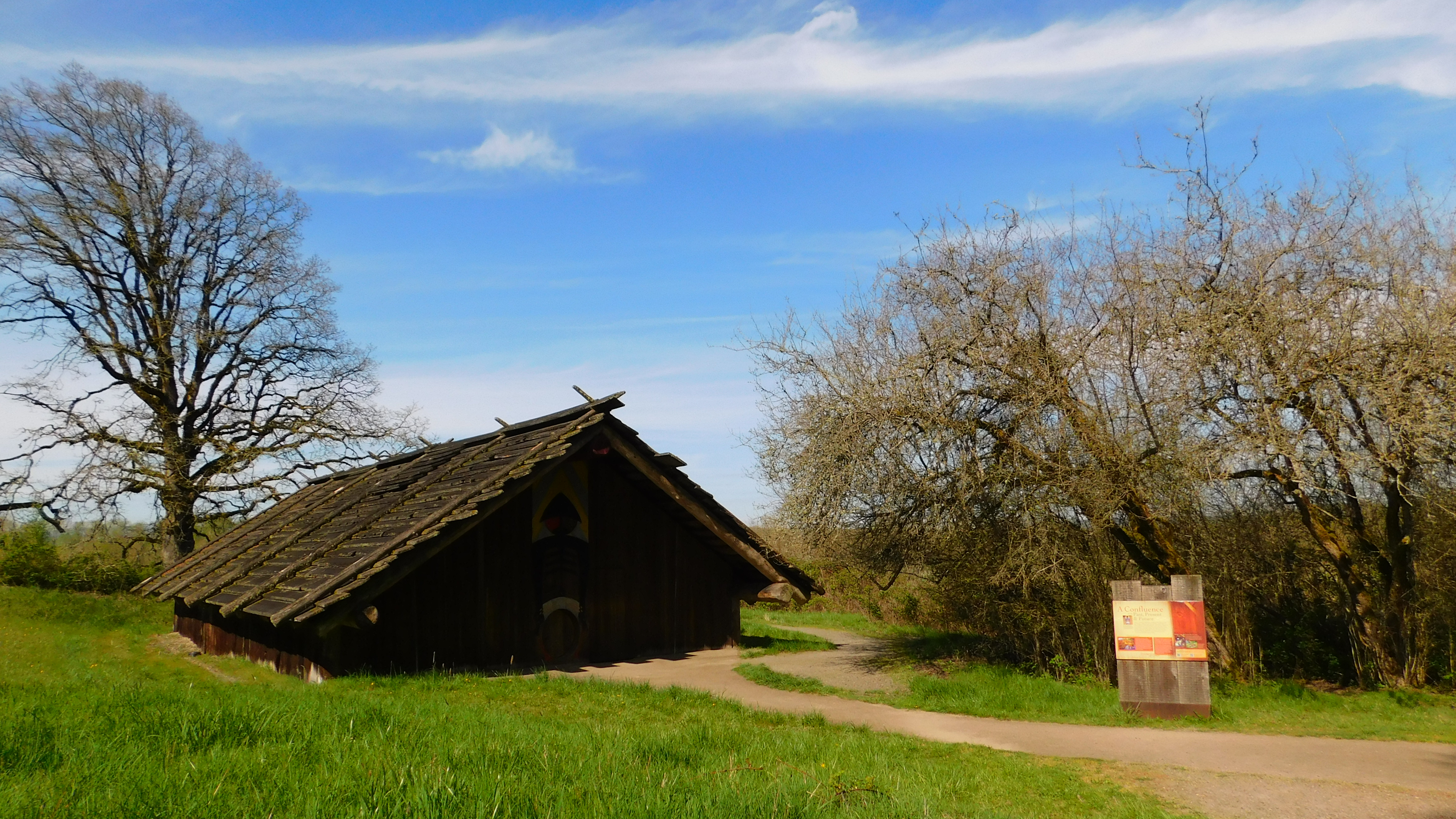
Cathlapotle Plankhouse, 2026

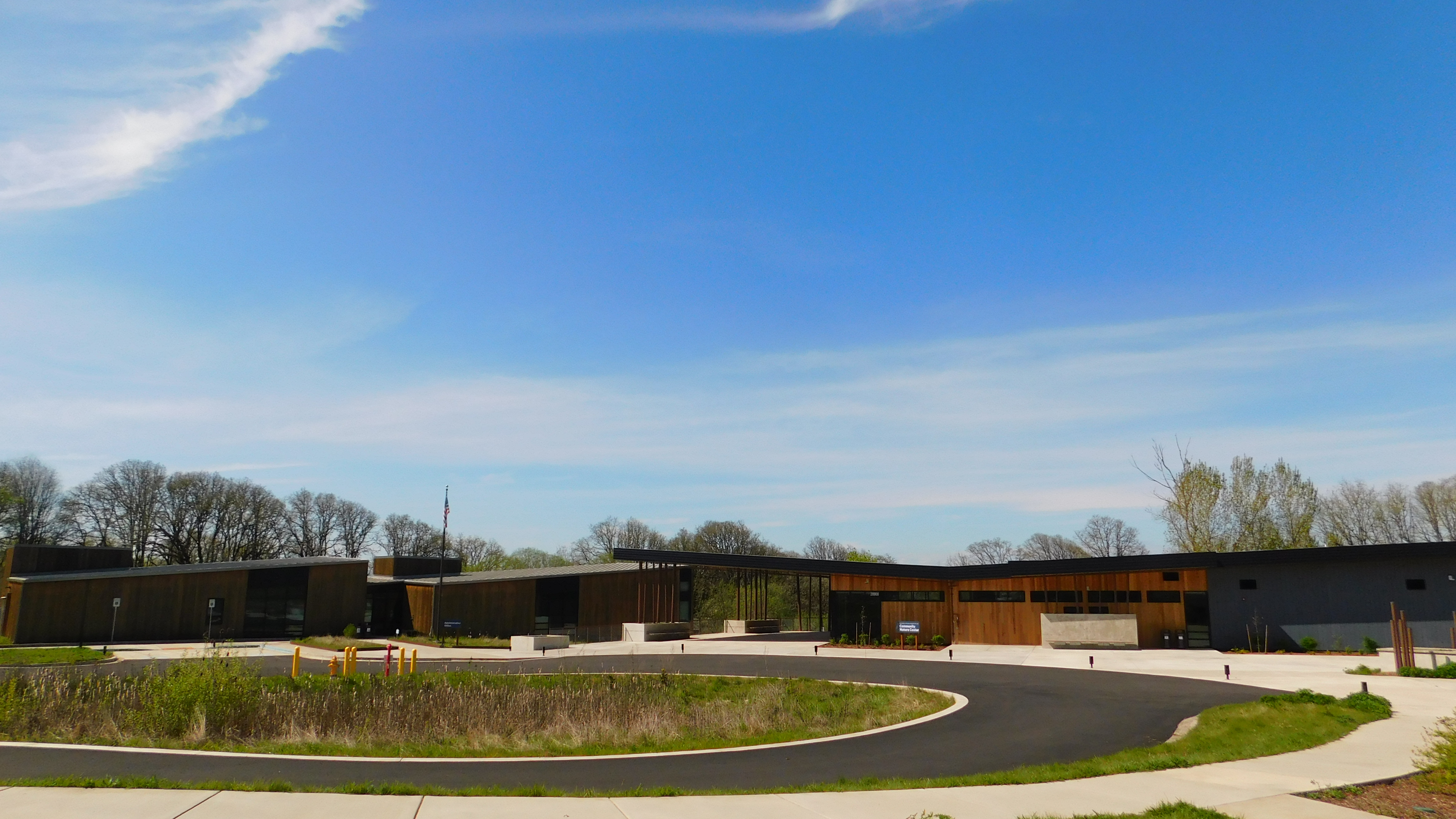
Carty Unit administrative and community hall center, 2026

== Refuge units and activities ==
The refuge is organized into several units. The conservation of the natural Columbia River floodplain is the management objective of the Carty Unit, which contains a 2 miles (3.2 km) self-guided hiking trail, and the Roth and Ridgeport Dairy units.

The River 'S' and Bachelor Island units are managed to maximize habitat for waterfowl and other wetland wildlife. The River 'S' Unit is accessible by a 4.2 miles (6.8 km) auto tour route and the 1.2 miles (1.9 km) Kiwa Hiking Trail; the Kiwa trail is closed during the sandhill crane nesting season. A small path, open for the entire year, leads to a bird hide.

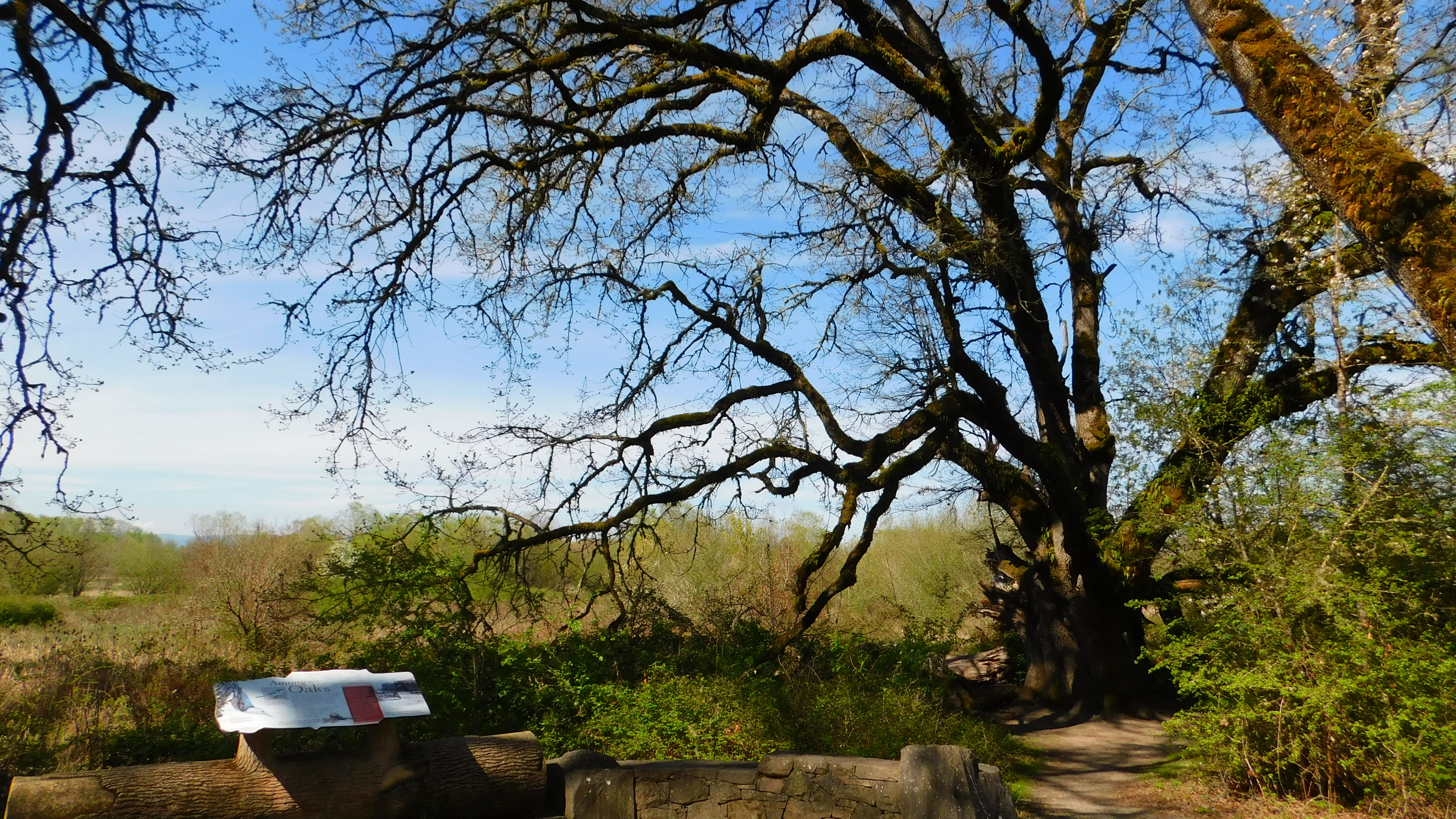
Oak tree and interpretive panel, 2026

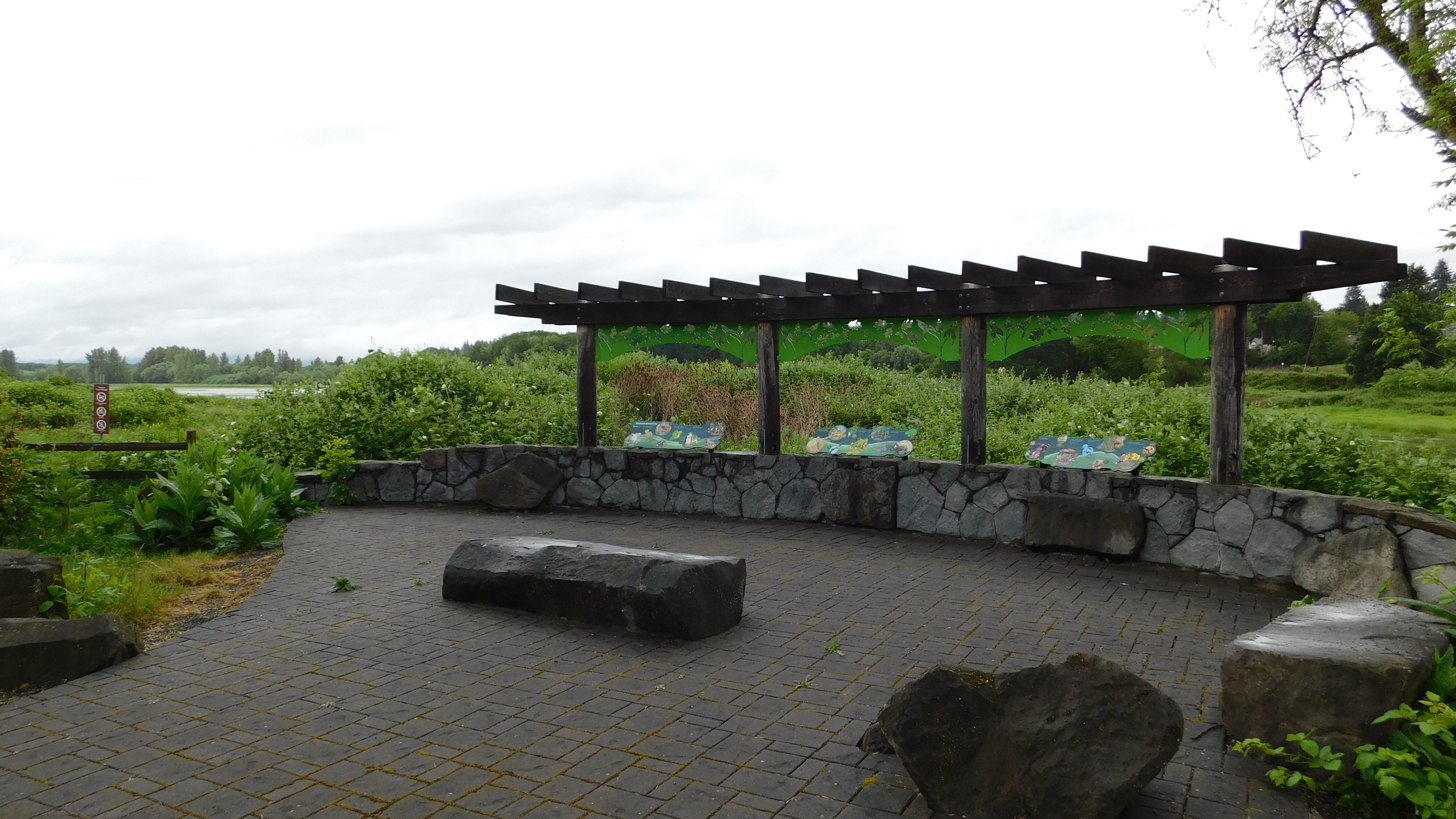
Trailhead and interpretive display, Carty Trail, 2026

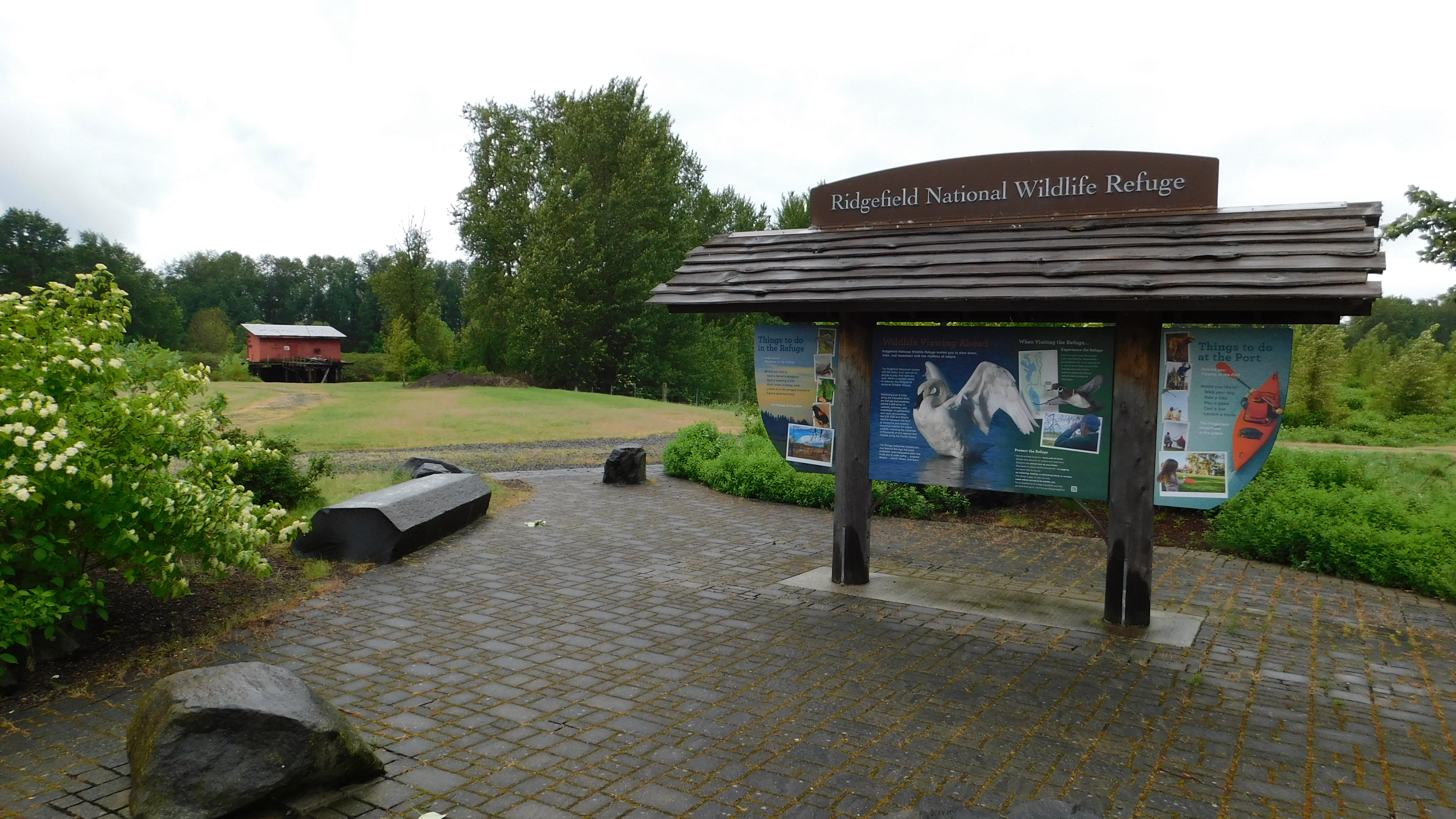
Carty Trail interpretive panel, 2026

== Wildlife ==
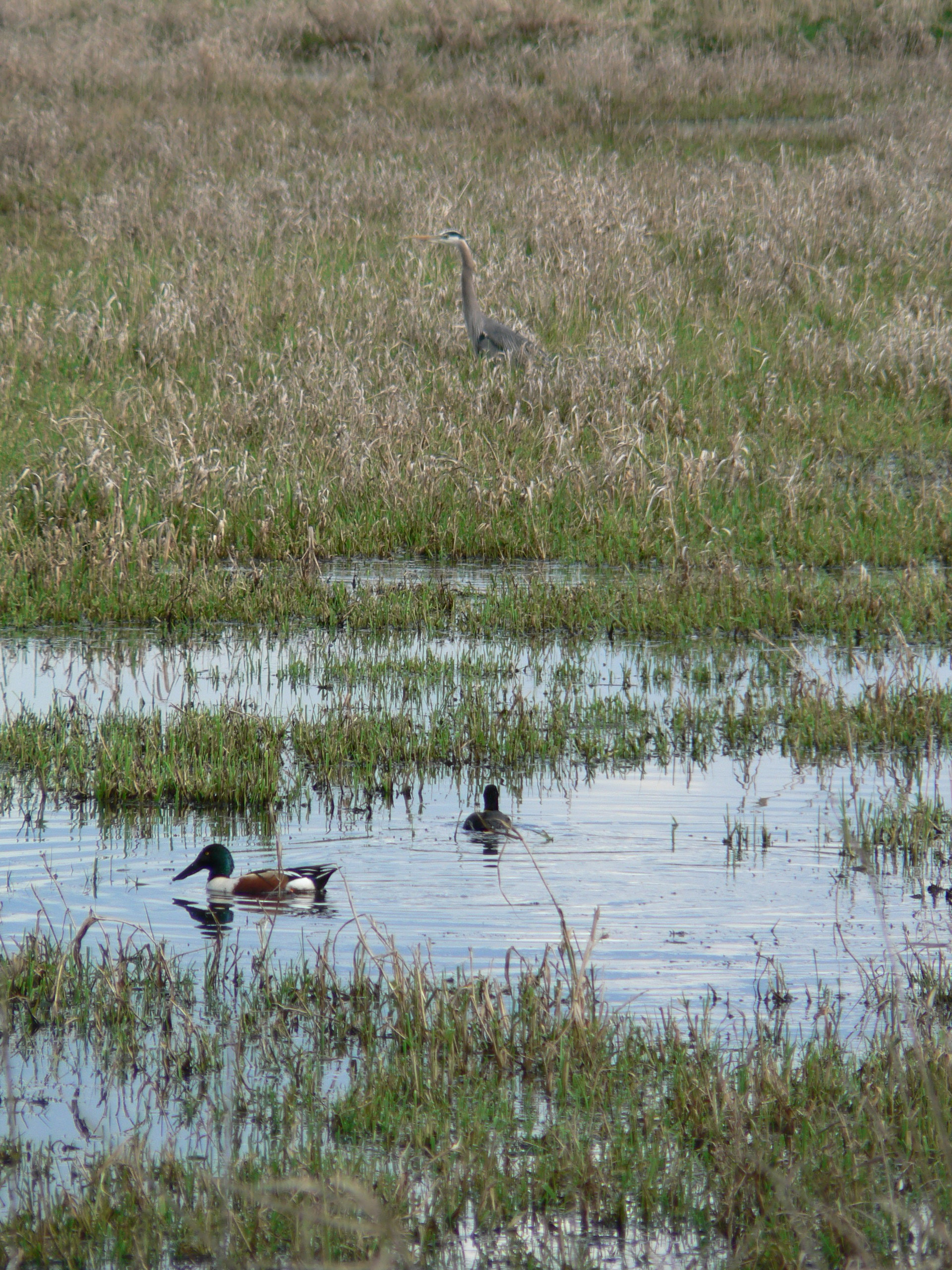
Waterfowl, 2006

Stately sandhill cranes, shorebirds, Tundra swan, and a great variety of songbirds stop at the refuge during spring and fall migrations. Some bird species such as mallards, Canada geese, great blue herons, mud hens, pheasant, mourning doves, ruffed grouse, barn owl, great horned owl, bald eagles, ospreys and red-tailed hawks are year-round residents that nest on the refuge. Black-tailed deer and cougars are the largest mammals on the refuge. Smaller mammal species such as coyote, red fox, raccoon, skunk, porcupine, bobcat, beaver, mink, river otter, muskrat, badger and brush rabbits are occasionally seen.

The 2012 relocation efforts of endangered Columbian white-tailed deer to the refuge is considered a part of the doubling of the species population to over 900 in the Lower Columbia River basin by 2015. This increase led the deer to be recommended to be reclassified as threatened. The deer often stray beyond the refuge boundaries, recorded as swimming to Sauvie Island in the Columbia River.

The River 'S' Unit, in 2023, recorded 239 different bird species, ranking the refuge as 15th in the state for avian diversity.

== Quarries ==
The Carty Unit of the refuge includes seven historic quarries, listed on the National Register of Historic Places as Basalt Cobblestone Quarries District.

== See also ==
- List of National Wildlife Refuges
