= Gee Hill =

Mountain peak in Hickman County, Tennessee

Coordinates: 35.8145115°N 87.2583432°W

Gee Hill [el. 696 ft (212 m)] is a summit in Hickman County, Tennessee, in the United States.

Gee Hill was named for a pioneer named Gee, who settled there.
