= G' =

G' may refer to:

- Gʻ, a letter of the Uzbek Latin alphabet, representing the voiced uvular fricative /ʁ/
- The shear storage modulus, a parameter of the dynamic modulus in the rheology of fluids
