= Elkhorn Mountain (Washington) =

Mountain in Washington (state), United States

- Location within Washington (state)

Highest point
- Elevation: 2,225 ft (678 m)
- Coordinates: 45°44′19″N 122°22′16″W

Geography
- Location: Clark County, Washington, U.S.
- Parent range: Cascades
- Topo map: USGS Larch Mountain

Elkhorn Mountain, is a mountain in Clark County, Washington. The highest point of Elkhorn Mountain is at 2,228 feet (679 m). It rises northeast of Vancouver, Washington.
