= Curtis Lake (Clark County, Washington) =

Lake in Clark County, Washington, United States

- Location within Washington (state) Location within the United States
- Location: Adjacent to confluence of Salmon Creek and Lake River
- Coordinates: 45°43′45″N 122°44′19″W
- Primary outflows: Curtis Creek
- Basin countries: United States
- Surface elevation: 10 feet (3.0 m)
- Settlements: Felida and Vancouver

Curtis Lake is a lake in Clark County in the U.S. state of Washington. The lake, near the confluence of Salmon Creek and Lake River, is northwest of the community of Felida.

The lake is home to two nonindigenous aquatic species; Perca flavescens (yellow perch) and Pomoxis annularis (white crappie).

== Curtis Creek ==
The lake's single outlet is Curtis Creek which empties into Salmon Creek.

== See also ==
- List of lakes in Washington
