= Community Park (Ridgefield, Washington) =

Public park in Ridgefield, Washington, U.S.

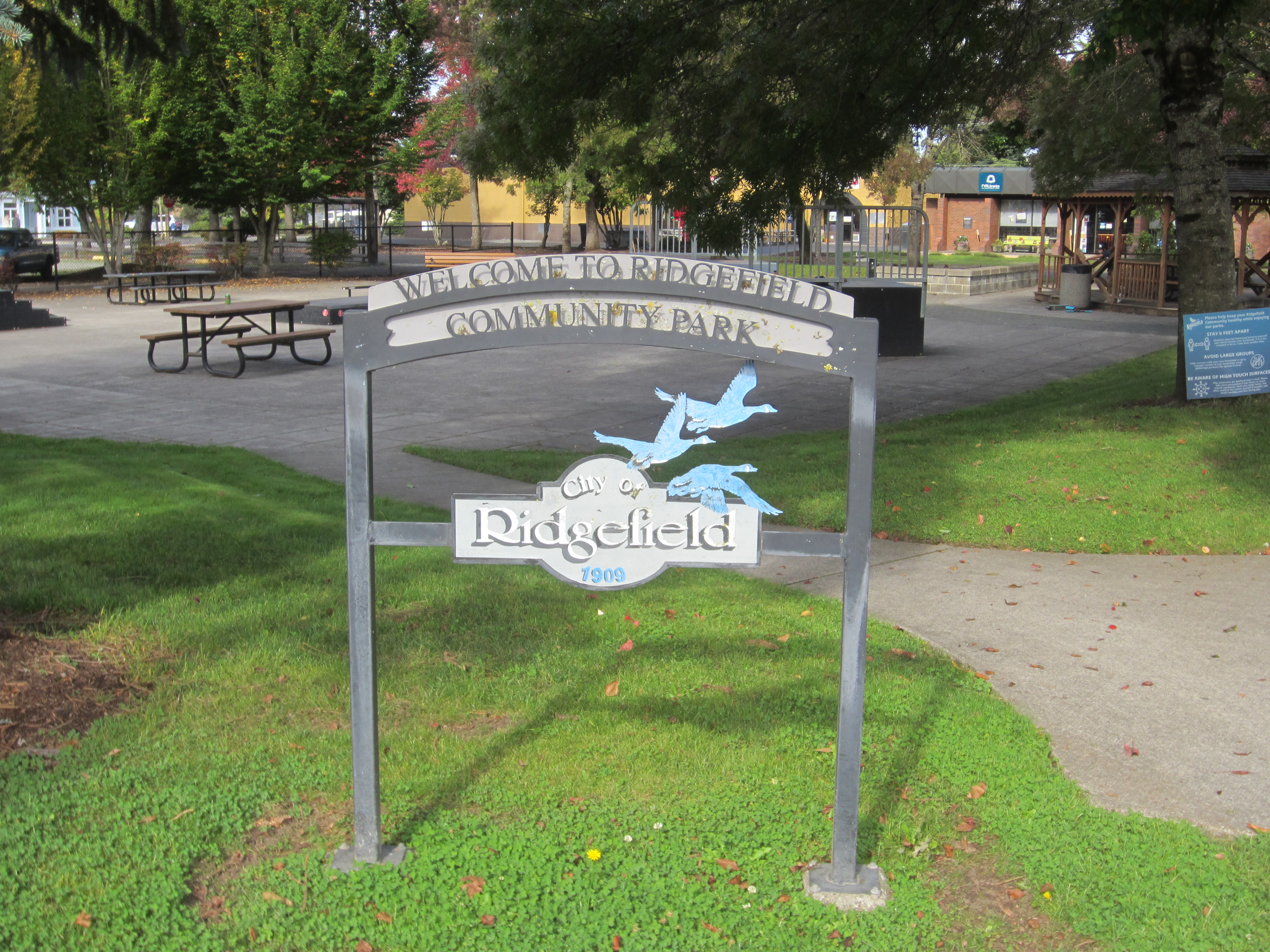
- Park signage, 2020

- Location within Washington (state)
- Interactive map of Community Park
- Location: Ridgefield, Washington, United States
- Coordinates: 45°48′58″N 122°44′43″W

Community Park is a public park in Ridgefield, Washington, United States. The park features a gazebo, an area for skateboarding, and picnic tables.
