= G-function =

- Barnes G-function, related to the Gamma function
- Meijer G-function, a generalization of the hypergeometric function
- Siegel G-function, a class of functions in transcendence theory
