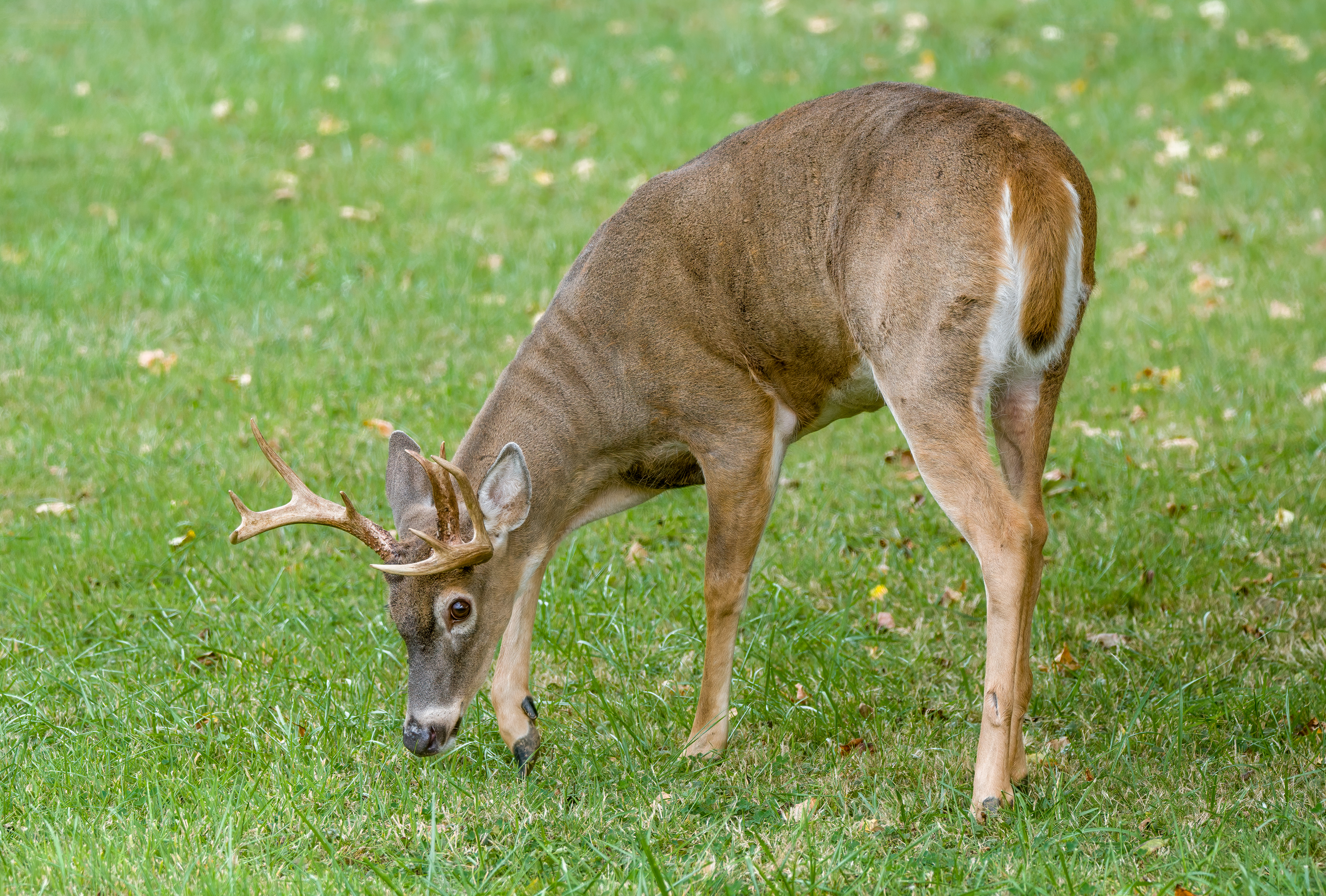

Conservation status
- Vulnerable (NatureServe)

Scientific classification
- Kingdom: Animalia
- Phylum: Chordata
- Class: Mammalia
- Order: Artiodactyla
- Family: Cervidae
- Subfamily: Capreolinae
- Genus: Odocoileus
- Species: O. virginianus
- Subspecies: O. v. leucurus

Trinomial name
- Odocoileus virginianus leucurus (Douglas, 1829)

= Columbian white-tailed deer =

Subspecies of deer

The Columbian white-tailed deer (Odocoileus virginianus leucurus) is one of the several subspecies of white-tailed deer in North America. It is a member of the Cervidae (deer) family, which includes mule deer, elk, moose, caribou, and the black-tailed deer that live nearby.

== Habitat and description ==
The Columbian white-tailed deer is named after the Columbia River in Oregon and Washington where it congregates. Columbian white-tailed deer are found along the lower Columbia River, on a series of islands in Clatsop and Columbia counties in Oregon, and Wahkiakum County, Washington. Other populations are found in the valley floors of the Umpqua River basin.

This white-tailed deer usually lives in and around riparian areas. It can also be found in brushy woodlots that contain cottonwood, willow, alder, spruce, and dogwood trees.

Unlike other white-tailed deer subspecies, which may breed at six months of age, female Columbian white-tailed deer first breed at about 18 months; they commonly have a single fawn. Male deer, or bucks, are also capable of breeding at 18 months of age.

== Conservation status ==
The Columbian white-tailed deer was federally listed as an endangered species in Washington and Oregon in 1967. Upon the creation of the Endangered Species Act in 1978, the deer was federally recognized as being endangered. On July 24, 2003, after decades of trying to save the Columbian white-tailed deer, the Douglas County, Oregon population of deer was removed from the Endangered Species Act. Efforts were carried out by the Oregon Department of Fish and Wildlife, and the Bureau of Land Management. Population numbers ranged from about 2,500 in the early 1980s to more than 6,000 today. Although the deer in one region have been removed from the protection of the Act, the Columbian white-tailed deer overall still remains on the Endangered Species Act. For more than two decades, the Columbian white-tail has been off limits to most hunting, but tags were made available in 2005 and there is the opportunity to hunt them at the Umpqua River.

The federally owned Julia Butler Hansen Refuge for the Columbian White-Tailed Deer, located in Cathlamet, Washington offers critical habitat protection for the Columbian white-tailed deer. Currently, about 300 Columbian white-tailed deer are protected on the refuge.

In April, 2012, high river flow levels coupled with a collapsing dike, that keeps the Columbia River from flooding the Julia Butler Hansen Refuge, was reported to be a threat to the resident population of Columbian white-tailed deer.

== See also ==
- United States Fish and Wildlife Service list of endangered species
