= G̃ (disambiguation) =

G̃ or g̃ is the letter G with a tilde.

G̃ or g̃ may also mean:

- g̃, a gluino
- G̃, a gravitino
