= Gardens for Health International =

American non-profit organization

Gardens for Health International (GHI) is an American-based 501(c)(3) non-profit organization that seeks to provide sustainable agricultural solutions to chronic childhood malnutrition. GHI partners with rural health centers in Rwanda to equip families with the seeds, skills, and support necessary to shift the paradigm of food aid from dependency to prevention and self-sufficiency.

== History ==
GHI was founded in 2007 by then college students Emma Clippinger, Emily Morell Balkin, and Julie Carney, with the goal of providing lasting agricultural solutions to pressing public health problems in Rwanda. Clippinger and Morell met in the summer of 2006 while interning in Rwanda with the Clinton Foundation’s HIV/AIDS initiative. They became interested in identifying programs that used agriculture as a means to improve nutrition and health rather than solely as a means to increase income.

Carney joined the founding team in 2007 and became GHI’s first country director in 2008, when she launched GHI’s pilot program. In response to Rwanda’s 44% childhood malnutrition rate, GHI’s programming evolved to focus on this particular public health challenge. Under Carney, GHI launched its core effort in August 2010, in the form of a health center program. Through this program, GHI partners with rural health centers with the aim of bringing lasting agricultural solutions to families in need.

Carney approached the design and implementation of this health center program through the lens of community-led development. The GHI curriculum and training methodology was created in partnership with mothers that the organization serves, and the organization's agriculture team works cross-culturally to continue designing interventions.

== Programs ==
Child Nutrition Program

GHI’s flagship program serves malnourished children under five. They identify malnourished children by enrolling their mothers for a 3-month training. Over fourteen weeks, participants attend agriculture training in their village and health and nutrition training at their local health clinic. Recognizing the complex nature of the problem of malnutrition, these classes also broach often taboo topics such as family planning and mental illness.

== Partners ==
GHI works closely with the government of Rwanda, working within the rural health center system, and has been identified as a key partner in a national plan to eliminate malnutrition. Currently, GHI works with four health centers in Rwanda's Gasabo district: Gikomero, Rubungo, Nyaconga, and Kayanga. In the Musanze district, it works with four health centers: Murandi, Gasiza, Shingiro, and Kinigi. GHI provides nutrition workshops to workers at these health centers through the ACCESS project and partners with the Segal Family Foundation to offer training to clinical partners throughout these regions.

The organization also works with the European Union and UNICEF to advocate for policies and programs that promote sustainable, nutrition-based agricultural practices as well as the integration of holistic, peer-based education into the prevention and treatment of malnutrition. GHI presented at the Rwandan Ministry of Health's 2011 and 2014 National Nutrition Summit, contributed to the National Strategy for the Transformation of Agriculture in 2013 and participated in the 2012 Skoll World Forum and the 2012 Opportunity Collaboration.

Since 2017, GHI has been collaborating with UNHCR and Save the Children. Together, GHI and these international organizations have worked in Mahama Refugee Camp to provide nutrition demos and life-skills sessions. There are plans to apply these trainings training to Kigeme Refugee Camp. The goal in these partnerships is to improve the health of children and decrease malnutrition.

GHI has also developed a partnership with Community Health Workers' community growth monitoring campaigns. With this partnership, GHI has weighed and measured 16,184 to date.

Since 2017 World Food Programme is working with GHI to implement a School Training Guide. These programs train "head teachers" in creating a school garden, with the hope that surrounding communities will benefit from the skills students and teachers learn in these classes.

GHI has also partnered with a Kate Spade factory that employs almost exclusively women in the Masoro District of Kigali. GHI implemented a temporary program called "Life Skills Friday," which women who work at the factory have continued. The women end work early on Fridays to meet and collaborate ways of improving the health and diet of their children.

== Evidence of impact ==
- 4,919 mothers, farmers, refugees, and educators trained through GHI curriculum
  - 97,000+ children reached
- 2,735 mothers graduated from GHI's maternal nutrition program (double the number of 2017)
- 882 families graduated from GHI's child nutrition program

== Accolades ==
- Forbes 30 Under 30 Social Entrepreneurs
- East Africa Acumen Fellowship
- Echoing Green Fellowship
- JP Morgan Good Venture Undergraduate Competition
- Clinton Global Initiative University Outstanding Commitment Award
- Staples Youth Social Entrepreneur Competition
- Ashoka East Africa Fellowship
- Worldwatch Institute Innovation of the Month
- Bluhm/Helfand Social Innovation Fellowship
- Dell Social Innovation Challenge
