= Gee, Kentucky =

Unincorporated community in Kentucky, United States

Gee
- Unincorporated community
- Location within the state of Kentucky Gee (the United States)
- Coordinates: 38°2′42″N 85°3′47″W
- Country: United States
- State: Kentucky
- County: Anderson
- Elevation: 745 ft (227 m)
- Time zone: UTC-5 (Eastern (EST))
  - Summer (DST): UTC-4 (EDT)
- GNIS feature ID: 508078

Gee is an unincorporated community located in Anderson County, Kentucky, United States. Its post office is closed.

Some say Gee was named after the local Gee family, while others believe the name's brevity caused it to be selected.
