= G band =

G band may refer to:

== Electromagnetic spectrum ==
- G band (IEEE), a millimetre wave band from 110 to 300 GHz
- G band (NATO), a radio frequency band from 4 to 6 GHz
- G band, a passband centred at 464 nm in the astronomical photometric system

== Other uses ==
- G banding, in cytogenetics
- The G Band, an English glam rock band
