= Gee (nickname) =

Gee is the nickname of:

- Gee Abanilla (born 1966), Filipino basketball former player, coach and manager
- Gee Atherton (born 1985), English racing cyclist
- Gee Mitchell (1912–1984), American college football and boxing coach
- Gee Tucker (born 1946), American actress, former model, dancer, and businessperson
- Gee Walker (1908–1981), American Major League Baseball player
- Gerard Way (born 1977), American singer, songwriter, and comic book writer, lead singer of rock band My Chemical Romance
