= Abrams Park =

Park in Clark County, Washington, United States

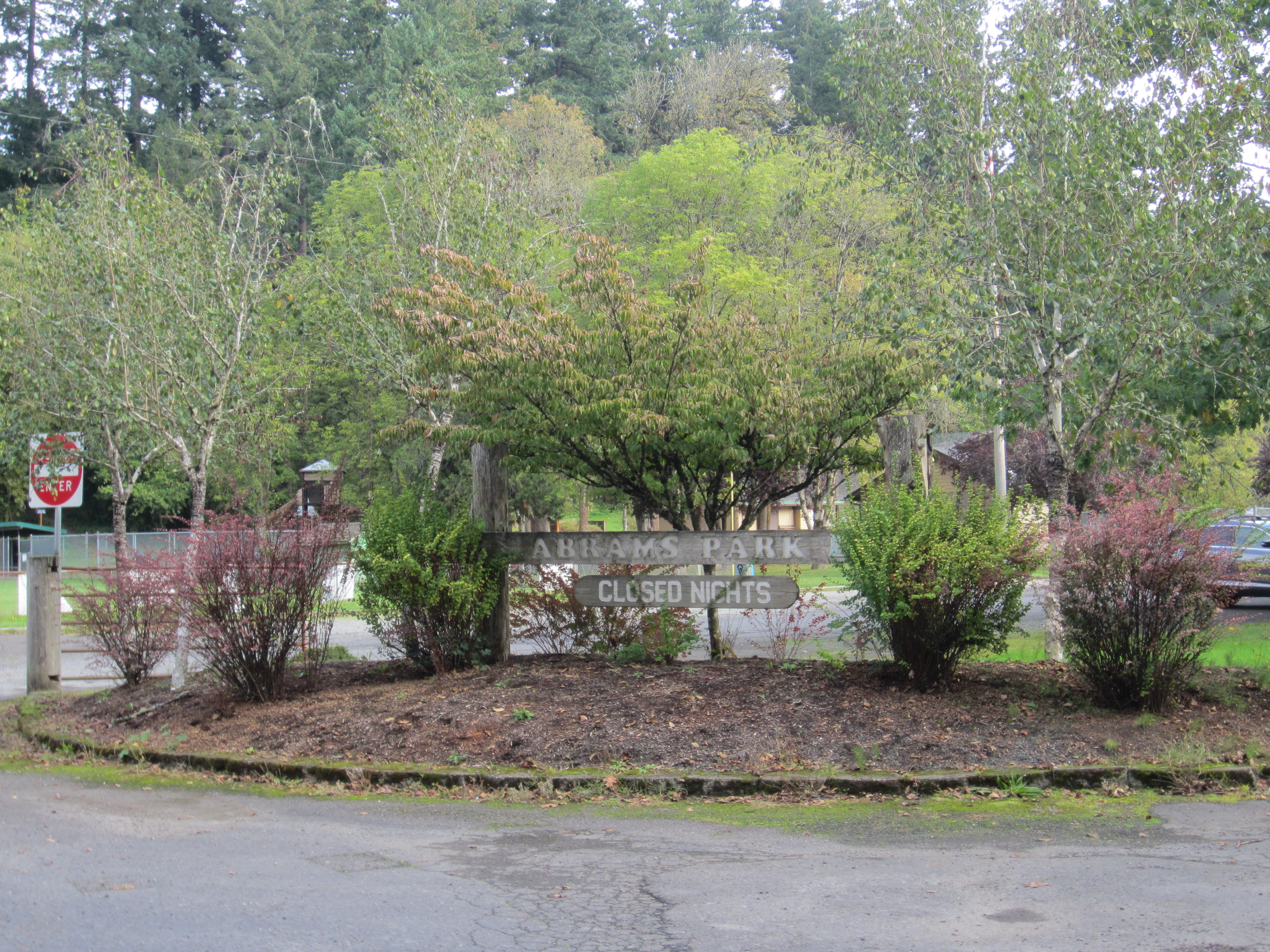
- Park signage, 2020

- Location within Washington (state)
- Interactive map of Abrams Park
- Location: Ridgefield, Washington, United States
- Coordinates: 45.818°N 122.737°W

Abrams Park is a 40-acre (16 ha) public park in Ridgefield, Washington, United States. The park features a playground, disc golf course, horseshoe pit, and picnic shelter called Bennett Hall, as well as fields for baseball, softball, soccer and volleyball.
