= Ghee (disambiguation) =

Ghee is a class of clarified butter that originated in South Asia.

Ghee is also an Irish, English and Chinese surname and may refer to:

- Brandon Ghee (born 1987), American football player
- Chan Tien Ghee, Malaysian businessman
- Gareth Ghee, Irish hurler
- Milt Ghee (1891–1975), American football player

== See also ==
- GHI (disambiguation)
- McGhee, a surname
- McGee (disambiguation)
