= Gee Creek (Florida) =

- Location within Florida Location within the United States

Physical characteristics
- Source
  - coordinates: 28.6847222°N 81.3283333°W
- Mouth
  - coordinates: 28.7158292°N 81.2897887°W

Gee Creek is a stream in the U.S. state of Florida. It is a tributary to Soldier Creek.

Gee Creek was named after Henry Gee, a local landowner.
