= Ridgefield, Washington =

- City
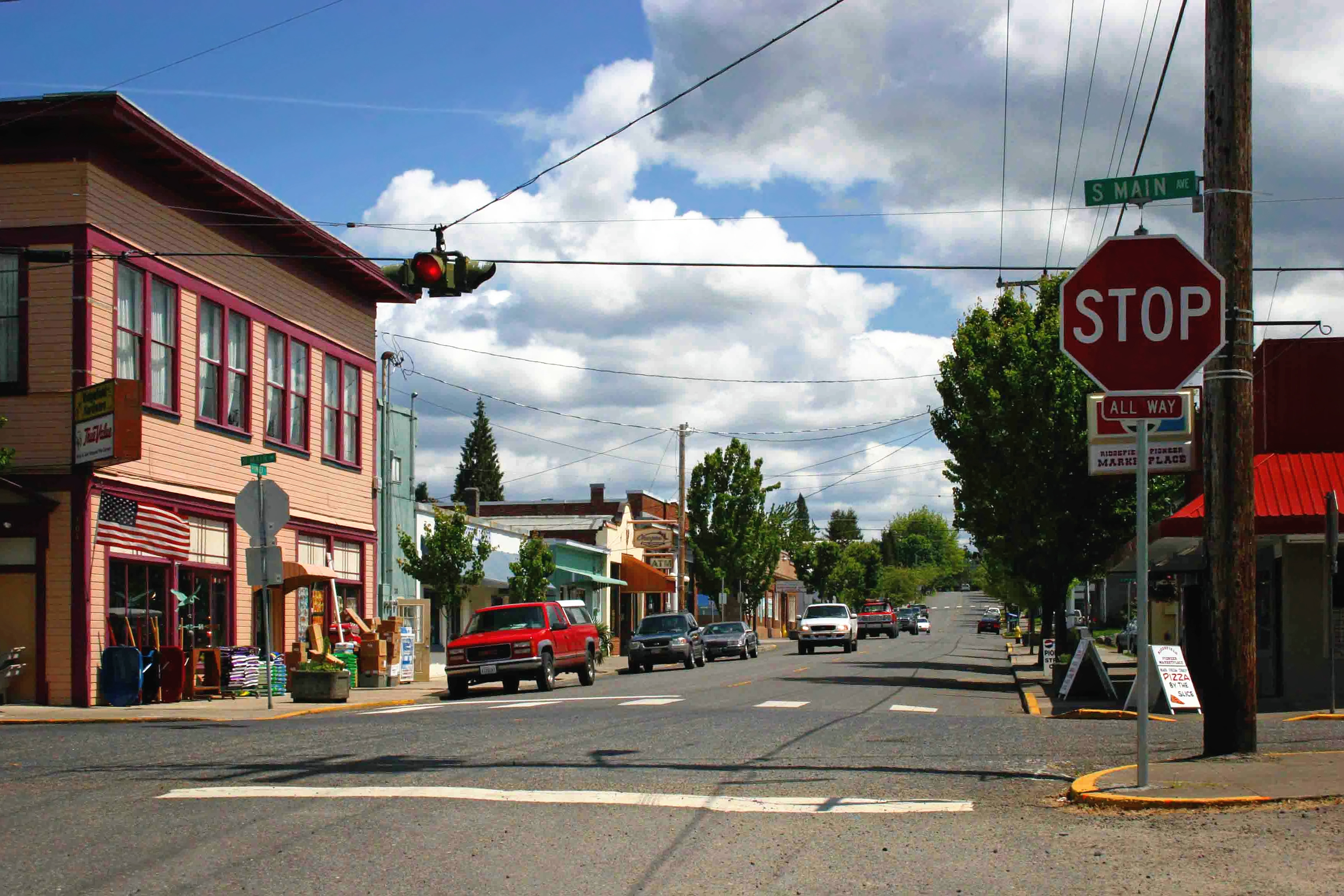
- Downtown Ridgefield, 2006
- Interactive map of Ridgefield, Washington
- Location within Washington (state) Location within the United States
- Coordinates: 45.817571°N 122.671959°W
- Country: United States
- State: Washington
- County: Clark
- Founded: 1909
- Incorporated: August 26, 1909

Government
  - Type: Council–manager
  - Mayor: Matt Cole
  - Mayor Pro Tem: Judy Chipman
  - City manager: Steve Stuart

Area
  - Total: 7.674 sq mi (19.876 km^{2})
  - Land: 7.599 sq mi (19.681 km^{2})
  - Water: 0.075 sq mi (0.193 km^{2}) 0.98%
- Elevation: 259 ft (79 m)

Population (2020)
  - Total: 10,319
  - Estimate (2025): 16,132
  - Density: 1,358.0/sq mi (524.31/km^{2})
- Time zone: UTC–8 (Pacific (PST))
  - Summer (DST): UTC–7 (PDT)
- ZIP Code: 98642
- Area codes: 360 and 564
- FIPS code: 53-58410
- GNIS feature ID: 2410945
- Website: ridgefieldwa.us

Ridgefield is a city in northern Clark County, Washington, United States. The population was 10,319 at the 2020 census, and was estimated at 16,132 in 2025.

Located within the Portland metropolitan area, Ridgefield is notable for the significant Native American history and connection to the Lewis and Clark Expedition. It is also the headquarters of the Ridgefield National Wildlife Refuge, a primary reserve for migrating waterfowl on the Pacific Flyway, and the home of the Ridgefield High School "Spudders" (reflecting the area's potato-farming heritage).

== History ==
=== Cathlapotle ===
Ridgefield is located near the site of Cathlapotle, a Chinookan village that had been occupied since 1450. It was potentially the latest version of a town that had existed there for over 2000 years. Cathlapotle participated in the fur trade since 1792, when villagers embarked on canoes to meet the Vancouver Expedition. The area has important ties to the Lewis and Clark Expedition of 1804–1806, which visited the town and described its layout in journals. By then, it was a settlement of 700–800 people, with at least 14 substantial plank houses. Malaria epidemics killed many of its residents during the 1800s, and most people left the village in the early 1830s. Some surviving Chinookan, Cowlitz and Klickitat people used the village until the 1850s, when white settlers began to establish themselves nearby. Use of the village ended when the U.S. forced local tribes to move onto reservations. The community's ties to the Chinookan people was commemorated by the construction of a replica of a Cathlapotle plank house at the nearby Ridgefield National Wildlife Refuge, which was dedicated on March 29, 2005.

James Carty, an Irish immigrant, built a log cabin at Cathlapotle in 1839 and lived with the remaining residents of the town for the next ten years. Three other men settled on a Lake River island nearby, which is now called Bachelor Island after them. In 1850, the U.S. Congress passed the Donation Land Claim Act, and over the next few years white settlers began to file land claims near Cathlapotle. Carty began a ferry over Lake River in 1851, and Arthur Quigley and Frederick Shobert created mud landings for passing steamboats to stop at the town, which became known as Shobert's Landing.

=== Shobert's Landing and Union Ridge ===
The community was an important trading center as early as the 1860s with its key location near the mouth of the Columbia River. Asa Richardson opened the first post office of Shobert's Landing in 1865 or 1873, which prompted the town to name itself Union Ridge. It was either named to reflect the town's overwhelmingly pro-Union sentiments during the Civil War or to honor the wave of Union veterans who moved there in the war's last year. This name is preserved in the current name of Union Ridge Elementary School. The town continued to grow, getting its first store in 1882 and its first church in 1883, a Presbyterian church that still stands on Main Avenue.

=== Ridgefield and city growth ===
Union Ridge was renamed Ridgefield in 1890 at the prompting of a new postmaster from Virginia, who did not want the name to reference the Union. A school, more industry, and an inter-town telephone line were added during the 1890s. A near-unanimous petition by town residents succeeded in closing the town's only saloon soon after it opened around 1900, and the next attempt to open a saloon there failed as well. In 1903, after years of delay, a railroad from Kalama to Vancouver was built through Ridgefield. Ridgefield voted to incorporate itself as a city in 1909, and also gained its first newspaper, the Ridgefield Reflector, that year.

Shingle mills were Ridgefield's primary industry until they shut down by 1957. The town dealt with recurrent destructive fires throughout the early 1900s, and grew slowly between 1920 and 1940. During the Great Depression, the town let people live on its Poor Farm and grow their own food. The town expanded again after voters approved the Port of Ridgefield in 1940. The arrival of I-5 in the 1960s increased access to Ridgefield further. In 1965, the land between Ridgefield and the Columbia River was turned into the Ridgefield National Wildlife Refuge by the U.S. Congress to protect the nesting grounds of Canada geese.

Ridgefield grew in population and land annexation during the 1990s. Excavation of Cathlapotle began in 1991, conducted by the U.S. Fish and Wildlife Service and Portland State University archaeologists. The city began a two-decade cleanup of the waterfront site of the Pacific Wood Treating plant after the company went bankrupt in 1993. In 1999, Ridgefield voted to switch from a strong-mayor to a council-manager city government, inspired by Battle Ground's recent change.

== Geography ==
According to the United States Census Bureau, the city has a total area of 7.674 square miles (19.88 km^{2}), of which 7.599 square miles (19.68 km^{2}) is land and 0.075 square miles (0.19 km^{2}) (0.98%) is water.

Parks in Ridgefield include Abrams Park, Community Park, Davis Park, and Overlook Park. The Ridgefield Veterans Memorial is adjacent to Community Park.

== Demographics ==
Historical population
Census	Pop.	Note	%±
1910	297		—
1920	620		108.8%
1930	607		−2.1%
1940	643		5.9%
1950	762		18.5%
1960	823		8.0%
1970	1,004		22.0%
1980	1,062		5.8%
1990	1,297		22.1%
2000	2,147		65.5%
2010	4,763		121.8%
2020	10,319		116.6%
2025 (est.)	16,132		56.3%
U.S. Decennial Census; 2020 Census

Ridgefield had an estimated population of 15,359 people in the 2024 American Community Survey conducted by the U.S. Census Bureau. The city had an estimated 4,702 households with an average of 2.85 persons per household. Ridgefield has a median household income of $116,389. Approximately 5.6% of the city's population lives at or below the poverty line. Ridgefield has an estimated 59.7% employment rate, with 38.9% of the population holding a bachelor's degree or higher and 95.8% holding a high school diploma. There were 4,722 housing units at an average density of 621.40 per square mile (239.9/km^{2}).

The top five reported languages (people were allowed to report up to two languages, thus the figures will generally add to more than 100%) were English (88.9%), Spanish (5.5%), Indo-European (1.8%), Asian and Pacific Islander (3.6%), and Other (0.2%).

Ridgefield, Washington – racial and ethnic composition Note: the US Census treats Hispanic/Latino as an ethnic category. This table excludes Latinos from the racial categories and assigns them to a separate category. Hispanics/Latinos may be of any race.
Race / ethnicity (NH = non-Hispanic)	Pop. 1980	Pop. 1990	Pop. 2000	Pop. 2010	Pop. 2020
White alone (NH)	1,005 (94.63%)	1,245 (95.99%)	2,022 (94.18%)	4,243 (89.08%)	8,169 (79.16%)
Black or African American alone (NH)	1 (0.09%)	5 (0.39%)	6 (0.28%)	40 (0.84%)	100 (0.97%)
Native American or Alaska Native alone (NH)	—	13 (1.00%)	21 (0.98%)	31 (0.65%)	63 (0.61%)
Asian alone (NH)	—	7 (0.54%)	14 (0.65%)	91 (1.91%)	350 (3.39%)
Pacific Islander alone (NH)	—	—	1 (0.05%)	6 (0.13%)	33 (0.32%)
Other race alone (NH)	23 (2.17%)	0 (0.00%)	1 (0.05%)	1 (0.02%)	72 (0.70%)
Mixed race or multiracial (NH)	—	—	44 (2.05%)	106 (2.23%)	692 (6.71%)
Hispanic or Latino (any race)	33 (3.11%)	27 (2.08%)	38 (1.77%)	245 (5.14%)	840 (8.14%)
Total	1,062 (100.00%)	1,297 (100.00%)	2,147 (100.00%)	4,763 (100.00%)	10,319 (100.00%)

=== 2020 census ===
As of the 2020 census, there were 10,319 people, 3,432 households, and 2,784 families residing in the city. The population density was 1,405.28 inhabitants per square mile (542.6/km^{2}). There were 3,687 housing units at an average density of 502.11 per square mile (193.9/km^{2}). The racial makeup of the city was 81.50% White, 1.05% African American, 0.68% Native American, 3.48% Asian, 0.32% Pacific Islander, 2.70% from some other races and 10.27% from two or more races. Hispanic or Latino people of any race were 8.14% of the population.

The median age was 35.6 years. 29.6% of residents were under the age of 18 and 11.4% of residents were 65 years of age or older. For every 100 females there were 97.6 males, and for every 100 females age 18 and over there were 95.4 males age 18 and over.

98.9% of residents lived in urban areas, while 1.1% lived in rural areas.

Of those households, 45.7% had children under the age of 18 living in them. 67.1% were married-couple households, 10.4% were households with a male householder and no spouse or partner present, and 15.8% were households with a female householder and no spouse or partner present. About 13.1% of all households were made up of individuals and 4.4% had someone living alone who was 65 years of age or older.

There were 3,687 housing units, of which 6.9% were vacant. The homeowner vacancy rate was 2.5% and the rental vacancy rate was 12.5%.

=== 2010 census ===
As of the 2010 census, there were 4,763 people, 1,591 households, and 1,258 families residing in the city. The population density was 672.93 inhabitants per square mile (259.8/km^{2}). There were 1,695 housing units at an average density of 239.47 per square mile (92.5/km^{2}). The racial makeup of the city was 92.42% White, 0.88% African American, 0.82% Native American, 1.97% Asian, 0.13% Pacific Islander, 0.94% from some other races and 2.83% from two or more races. Hispanic or Latino people of any race were 5.14% of the population.

There were 1,591 households, 48.1% had children under the age of 18 living with them, 62.0% were married couples living together, 11.6% had a female householder with no husband present, 5.5% had a male householder with no wife present, and 20.9% were non-families. 16.2% of households were one person and 6.1% were one person aged 65 or older. The average household size was 2.99 and the average family size was 3.34.

The median age was 32.4 years. 33.5% of residents were under the age of 18; 6.2% were between the ages of 18 and 24; 29.7% were from 25 to 44; 22.9% were from 45 to 64; and 7.7% were 65 or older. The gender makeup of the city was 49.9% male and 50.1% female.

== Economy ==
Rental and storage company U-Haul was founded in Ridgefield in the summer of 1945.

On August 29, 2024, Ridgefield became the location of the 34th Costco retail in Washington.

On August 20, 2025, Ridgefield became the location of the first In-N-Out Burger restaurant in Washington.

== Government ==
Ridgefield has a council–manager form of government, with a city manager who is appointed by a city council with seven elected members. The city council also selects a mayor from among themselves. The current city manager is Steve Stuart, a former county commissioner who was hired in 2014. In January 2025, Matt Cole was appointed Mayor. He has served as a city council member since 2022. Judy Chipman was appointed Mayor Pro Tem also in January 2025. She has served as a city council member since 2021.

== Education ==
The Ridgefield School District has five schools: Union Ridge Elementary, South Ridge Elementary, Sunset Ridge Intermediate School, View Ridge Middle School, and Ridgefield High School.

4,367 students enrolled at Ridgefield School District No. 122 in the school year of 2025-26.

== Notable people ==
- Scott Mosier, film producer and podcaster
- Richie Sexson, former major league baseball player
- Leonard Shoen, founded U-Haul in Ridgefield
