= Camas–Washougal Fire Department =

Fire department for Camas and Washougal, Washington

Camas–Washougal Fire Department (CWFD)
Operational area
- Country: United States
- State: Washington
- County: Clark
- City: Camas; Washougal
- Address: 616 NE 4th Avenue; Camas, WA 98607 (headquarters)
- Coordinates: 45.58674°N 122.40184°W

Agency overview
- Annual calls: 4998 (2021)
- Annual budget: $12,506,692 (2021)
- Fire chief: Cliff Free
- Motto: "Working toward a safer community"

Facilities and equipment
- Battalions: 1
- Stations: 3
- Engines: 5 (3 front line and 2 reserve)
- Ambulances: 4
- Wildland: 4
- Rescue boats: 2

Website
- official website

The Camas–Washougal Fire Department (CWFD) is a fire department providing fire protection and emergency medical services (EMS) to both the city of Camas and Washougal, Washington. CWFD is the only fire department in Clark County to have dedicated EMS instead of using AMR.

== Fire department merger ==
In 2013 the city governments of Camas and Washougal agreed to combine their two fire departments into one to eliminate unnecessary coasts, devise more effective fire prevention techniques, improve training, lower response time, and generally improve emergency services. Camas agreed to take on 60 percent of the costs, with Washougal taking on 40 percent.

In recent years, according to Washougal officials, the city could not afford to pay their 40 percent of the costs for staffing increases deemed necessary by fire department leaders for the two cities' population growth.

== Stations and apparatus ==
Fire station number	Location	Address	Apparatuses
41 (HQ)	Downtown Camas	616 NE 4th Avenue Camas	1 engine 2 medic units (Note: One of the medics cross-staffed with personnel from another unit in that station); 1 brush 1 battalion (Note: Cross-staffed with personnel from another unit in that station)
42 (Note: Fire department training facility)	Undeveloped area	4321 NW Parker Street Camas	2 engines (Note: One of the engines is a reserve); 1 medic unit 2 brush
43	Downtown Washougal	1400 A Street Washougal	2 engines 1 medic unit 1 brush
