= Lacamas Creek =

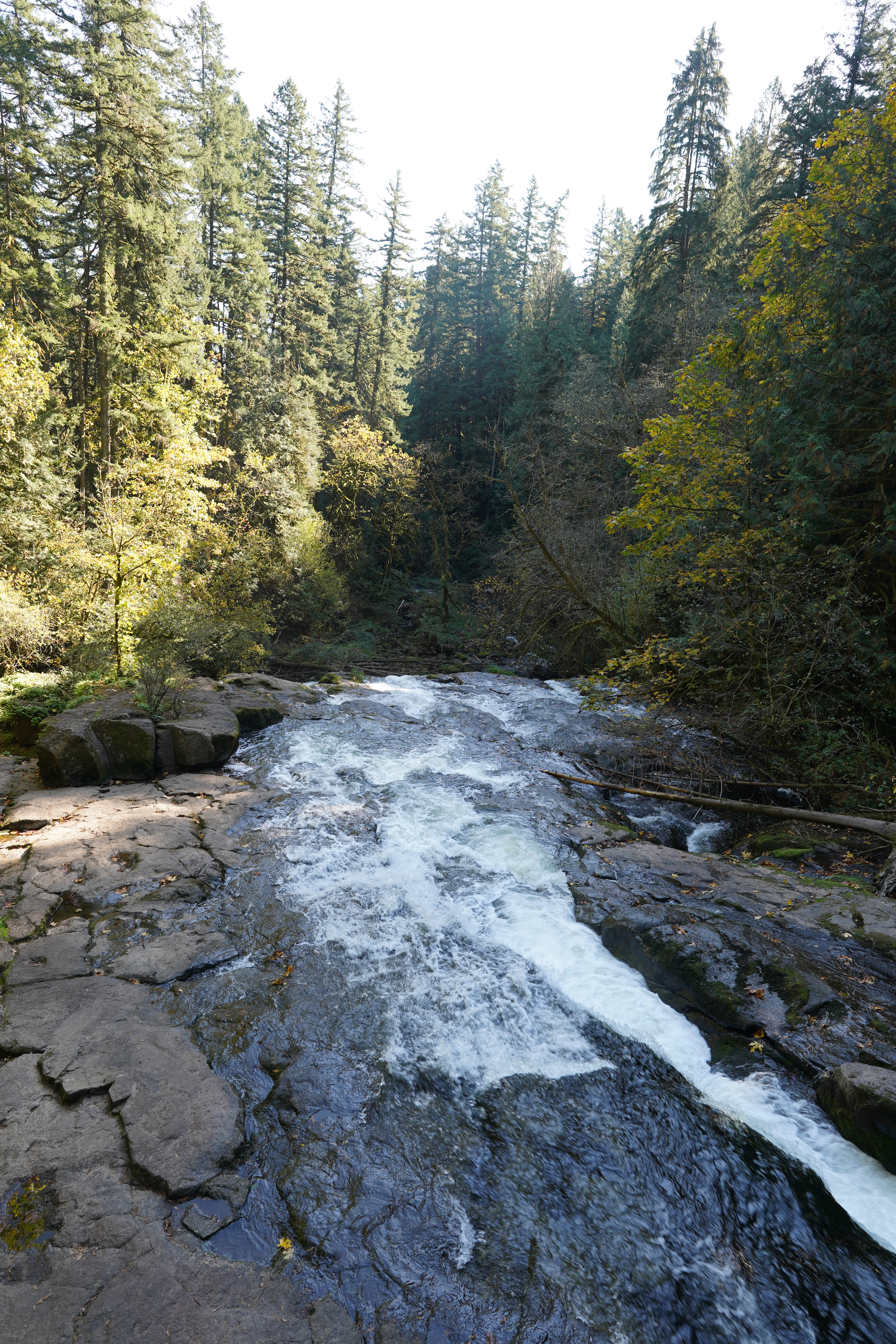
- Lower Falls

- Location of the mouth of Lacamas Creek in Washington Lacamas Creek (the United States)

Location
- Country: United States
- State: Washington (state)
- County: Clark

Physical characteristics
- Source: Confluence of the creek's east and west forks
  - location: Camp Bonneville
  - coordinates: 45°41′54″N 122°24′09″W
  - elevation: 365 ft (111 m)
- Mouth: Washougal River
  - location: Camas
  - coordinates: 45°35′13″N 122°23′32″W
  - elevation: 16 ft (4.9 m)
- Length: 12.5 mi (20.1 km)
- Basin size: 67 sq mi (170 km^{2})

Lacamas Creek is in Clark County, Washington, United States, and flows about 12.5 miles (20.1 km) from headwaters near Camp Bonneville to Lacamas Lake and Round Lake in Camas, and eventually into the Washougal River. Its name is derived from that of the native camas plant. Lacamas Creek is fed by numerous streams, but the five largest tributaries are Matney Creek, Shanghai Creek, Fifth Plain Creek, China Ditch, and Dwyer Creek.

Geologists believe that the creek once flowed westward through the Burnt Bridge Creek channel. This changed when the Missoula Floods deposited an alluvial fan that diverted the flow into the Lacamas Lake trough.

== Watershed and water quality ==
Lacamas Creek drains a basin of 67 square miles (170 km^{2}). About 41 percent of the basin is forested, while the rest is developed to one degree or another. The least developed land is near the headwaters, while the most developed is near the mouth. Farm fields, pastures, shrublands, and bare earth cover about 35 percent of the watershed. Residential, commercial, and industrial uses account for most of the rest.

Water quality along the creek varies from "good" in the forest to "fair" along the lower reaches near Camas. The watershed's artificial channels such as China Ditch have water of "very poor" quality. These were dug as early as the 1890s to drain wetlands for farming and to supply water to mills in Camas. Eliminating wetlands has increased runoff surges during heavy rains, eroded streambanks, and increased lowland flooding.

Lacamas and Round lakes, connected by a short channel, have water of "fair" quality. The sedimentation rate of the lakes has increased eightfold since the beginning of the 19th century. As a result, both lakes are eutrophic, containing many nutrients found in fertilizer, soil, and waste from people and animals. Blooms of algae and other aquatic plants supported by the nutrients deplete the oxygen in the lakes and make it hard for fish to survive.

== Recreation ==
Activities on Lacamas and Round lakes include boating, swimming, water skiing, picnicking, biking, and fishing. Lacamas Heritage Trail, 3.5 miles (5.6 km) long, runs along the shore of Lacamas Lake. A 6-mile (9.7 km) trail system at Lacamas Park at Round Lake connects to waterfalls on the lower reaches of the creek. Round Lake is stocked with bluegill, bass, and perch.

== See also ==
- List of rivers of Washington (state)
- Camas Potholes
