= Camas Potholes =

Coordinates: 45°35′54″N 122°24′07″W

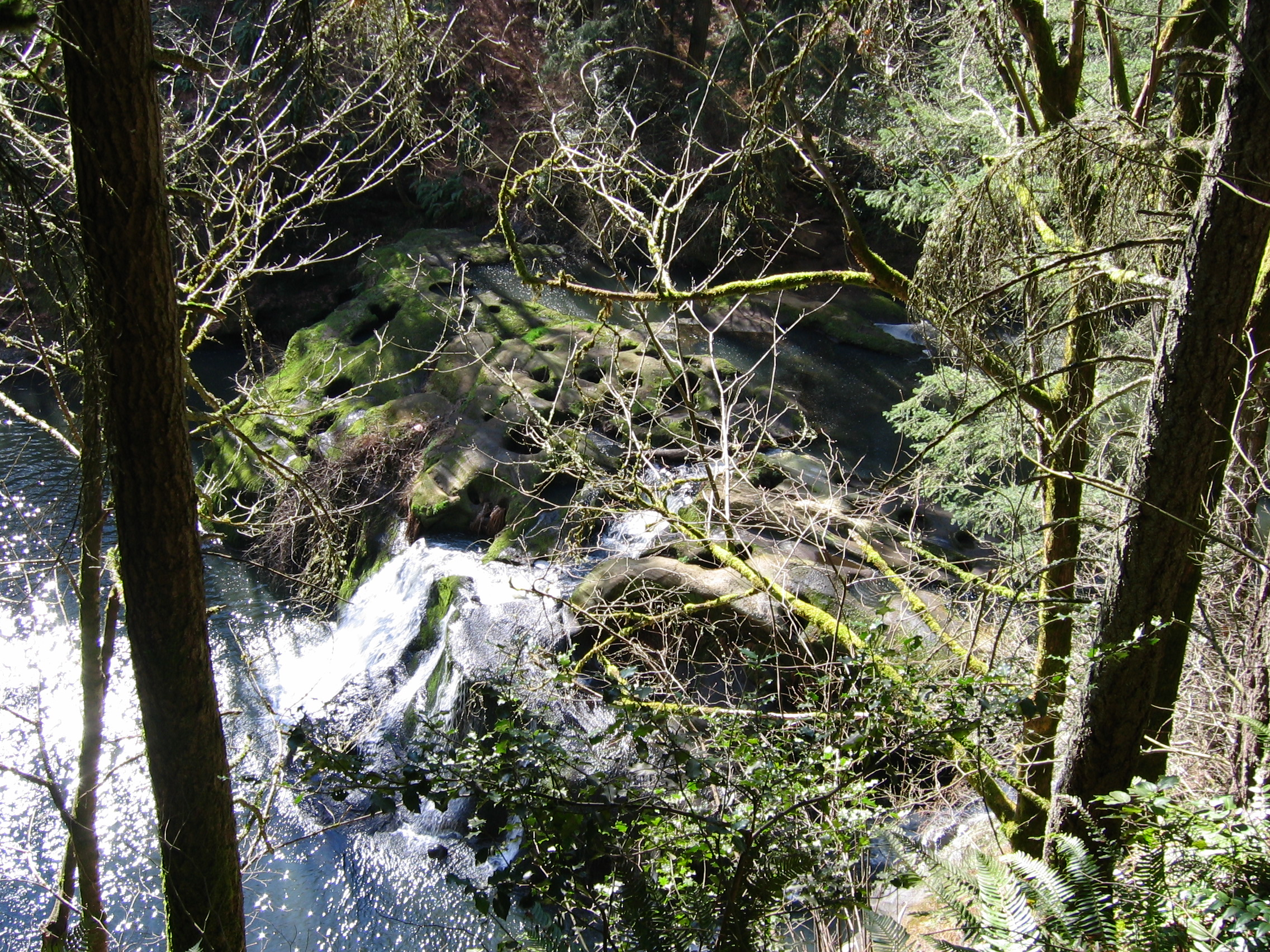
The Camas Potholes

The Camas Potholes (in Camas, Washington) is a popular destination for swimmers to jump from moderately high cliffs into the waters of Lacamas Creek below. During hot summer weather, the potholes attract many visitors. The Camas Potholes can be accessed via a trail from Lacamas Park.

Lacamas Park is an especially popular destination in the Camas/Washougal area. The potholes are featured by the Clark County Parks Department in their description of the park.

The potholes have been mentioned in several write-ups on the internet and are a popular subject for photographers.

The unusual water flow, drainage from an outlet dam of Lacamas Lake, has carved many potholes in the rock underneath Lacamas Creek. These potholes range in size from approximately 3–10 feet wide and 3–13 feet deep.

Although a popular summer destination for local swimmers, there have been many injuries involving The Camas Potholes. Serious head injuries have been sustained from jumping from high points, and there have been several deaths resulting from falls and drowning.
