= Fallen Leaf =

Fallen Leaf may refer to:

- Fallen Leaf, California, unincorporated community
- Fallen Leaf Lake (Washington), lake
- Fallen Leaf Lake (California), lake
