= Fern Prairie, Washington =

- Census-designated place
- Location within Washington (state)
- Coordinates: 45°37′50″N 122°23′12″W
- Country: United States
- State: Washington
- County: Clark

Area
  - Total: 5.0 sq mi (13.0 km^{2})
  - Land: 5.0 sq mi (13.0 km^{2})
  - Water: 0 sq mi (0.0 km^{2})
- Elevation: 482 ft (147 m)

Population (2010)
  - Total: 1,884
  - Density: 380/sq mi (145/km^{2})
- Time zone: UTC-8 (Pacific (PST))
  - Summer (DST): UTC-7 (PDT)
- FIPS code: 53-23690
- GNIS feature ID: 2584971

Fern Prairie is a census-designated place (CDP) in Clark County, Washington, United States. As of the 2020 census, Fern Prairie had a population of 2,061.

The community is located in southern Clark County, 16 miles (26 km) east of downtown Vancouver and 4 miles (6 km) north of Camas.

== Education ==
Most of Fern Prairie is in the Camas School District. Some parts are in the Washougal School District.

== Demographics ==
Historical population
Census	Pop.	Note	%±
2010	1,884		—
2020	2,061		9.4%
U.S. Decennial Census; 2000 2010

Fern Prairie first appeared as a census designated place in the 2010 U.S. census.

=== Racial and ethnic composition ===
Fern Prairie CDP, Washington – Racial and ethnic composition Note: the US Census treats Hispanic/Latino as an ethnic category. This table excludes Latinos from the racial categories and assigns them to a separate category. Hispanics/Latinos may be of any race.
Race / Ethnicity (NH = Non-Hispanic)	Pop 2010	Pop 2020	% 2010	% 2020
White alone (NH)	1,756	1,715	93.21%	83.21%
Black or African American alone (NH)	2	4	0.11%	0.19%
Native American or Alaska Native alone (NH)	18	14	0.96%	0.68%
Asian alone (NH)	21	36	1.11%	1.75%
Native Hawaiian or Pacific Islander alone (NH)	1	16	0.05%	0.78%
Other race alone (NH)	5	22	0.27%	1.07%
Mixed race or Multiracial (NH)	22	132	1.17%	6.40%
Hispanic or Latino (any race)	59	122	3.13%	5.92%
Total	1,884	2,061	100.00%	100.00%
