= Camas High School =

Public high school in Camas, Washington, United States

Location
- 26900 SE 15th St. Camas, Washington; United States; 45°36′44″N 122°23′54″W

Information
- Type: Public
- Established: 2003 (current building)
- School district: Camas School District
- Principal: Travis Drake
- Teaching staff: 89.68 (FTE)
- Enrollment: 2,026 (2024–2025)
- Student to teacher ratio: 22.59
- Colors: Red and black
- Mascot: Joe Papermaker
- Website: Camas High School

Camas High School is an public high school in the city of Camas, Washington in Clark County. The principal is Travis Drake.

It has a grade span of 9th through 12th and contained 2,063 students as of March 2018. It is operated by the Camas School District and includes a complement of 90 classroom teachers. The Camas High School colors are red, and black, the mascot is Joe Papermaker, and their team name is the "Camas High School Papermakers".

== Demographics ==
As of the 2016 school year, Camas High School contained 50.6% male students and 49.4% female students. The student racial makeup was 0.4% Native American/Alaskan Native; 6.9% Asian; 0.9% African American; 7.4% Hispanic; 77.0% Caucasian; and 7.1% two or more races. The average years of teacher experience was 11.1. The percentage of teachers with at least a master's degree was 84.4%. The dropout rate for the 2008/2009 school year was 1.1%, with a 92.5% on-time graduation rate. As of May 2010, 10.2% of students were enrolled in some sort of special education program.

== Academics ==
Students are required to take four years of American English, two years of science, three years of mathematics, two arts classes, an occupational education class, and a physical education class. Incoming freshmen also take an orientation course to learn study, research, and technological skills, unless they are students in the school's Math, Science, and Technology Magnet Program. Students have the option of taking at-level courses, Pre-Advanced Placement, or regular Advanced Placement courses for many subjects in each grade level.

CHS hosts programs such as Advanced Placement (AP) classes, as well as the ability to take advanced classes at nearby Clark College through taking such exams as Running Start, which when completed, will provide college money and credit for students. Another program at Camas High School is the STEM (Science, Technology, Engineering, and Math) Magnet program. CHS also has developed a Robotics Magnet program, known as CamTech.

The Senior Project is a program completed by seniors in which students must apply skills they have learned to a culminating project and paper of, totaling at least 40 hours of work. Students often use this as a way to pursue their interests in individual projects or as job shadows of professionals in the community, or benefit their community through charity or community service work. Failure to complete the project and accompanying paper will result in the inability to graduate on time.

== Athletics ==
Camas High School competes in the Greater St. Helens League of WIAA District IV in wrestling, boys' and girls' swimming, girls' volleyball, girls' dance, boys' and girls' basketball, football, baseball, cross country, softball, boys' and girls' golf, boys' and girls' tennis, girls bowling, track and field, boys' and girls' soccer, and girls' gymnastics. Their team name is the Papermakers, and their mascot is a humanized mechanical paper-rolling machine, which commemorates the town's founding industry, the production of paper goods at the Georgia Pacific paper mill.

=== State championships ===
- Boys' soccer: 2006, 2008, 2011
- Football: 2016, 2019
- Girls' Basketball: 2024
- Girls' Cross Country: 2011, 2012, 2014, 2015
- Girls' Soccer: 2005, 2016, 2021
- Girls' Tennis: 1977, 2022, 2023
- Boys' Tennis: 2023
- Softball: 2002
- Boys' Swimming: 2017, 2018
- Gymnastics: 2018, 2019, 2020
- Boys' Track & Field 2018
- Boys' Cross Country 2019

== Extracurricular activities ==
Clubs

Besides sports, CHS also supports various clubs and non-sporting teams. Some major clubs include Key Club International, DECA, FIRST Robotics Competition Team 2471, the National Honor Society, FCCLA, an award-winning Mock Trial team, Science Olympiad, in which Camas is a National contender, and Knowledge Bowl, in which Camas is a state contender.

Arts

The Camas High School Papermaker Marching Band performs bi-yearly at Disneyland and Walt Disney World. On October 16, 2023, Camas Mayor Steve Hogan proclaimed October 30 as "Camas High School Band Day."

Camas High School has yearbook, the Camasonian school newspaper, and various plays (including a fall production, a spring musical, and student-directed productions).

== Controversies ==
In February 2020, Principal Liza Sejkora remarked on the death of former professional basketball player Kobe Bryant on her Facebook page, writing, "Not gonna lie, seems to me that karma caught up with a rapist today." Immediately following that post, students protested and organized a walkout; while Sejkora issued an apology and was placed on administrative leave by the school board.

In December 2021, a letter was released by Eric Knox, a high school basketball coach from Portland, Oregon's Benson High School, detailing racist language used by Camas High School students against Benson High players. This letter triggered an internal investigation, ending with a public apology from the Camas School District school board, admitting to racism from Camas High School students.

In April 2022, The Camas High School junior varsity (JV) baseball team was under investigation for allegedly using racist words during a match against Skyview High School's JV team at Camas High School on April 20. During that game, witnesses alleged that some Camas JV players made racist comments and noises.

== Notable alumni ==
- Michael R. Barratt, NASA astronaut
- Greg Biffle, semi-retired professional stock car racing driver
- Jack Colletto, American football fullback for the Pittsburgh Steelers
- Alexa Efraimson, American former professional middle distance runner
- Joey Gibson, far right activist, founder of Patriot Prayer (attended but did not graduate)
- Morgan Grecco, Miss America's Teen 2022
- Denis Hayes, environmental activist, coordinator of the first Earth Day
- Brent Richards, American soccer player who currently plays for Orange County SC
- Jimmie Rodgers, American pop singer
- Taylor Williams, professional baseball pitcher for the Algodoneros de Unión Laguna
