= Camas School District =

School district in Washington, U.S.

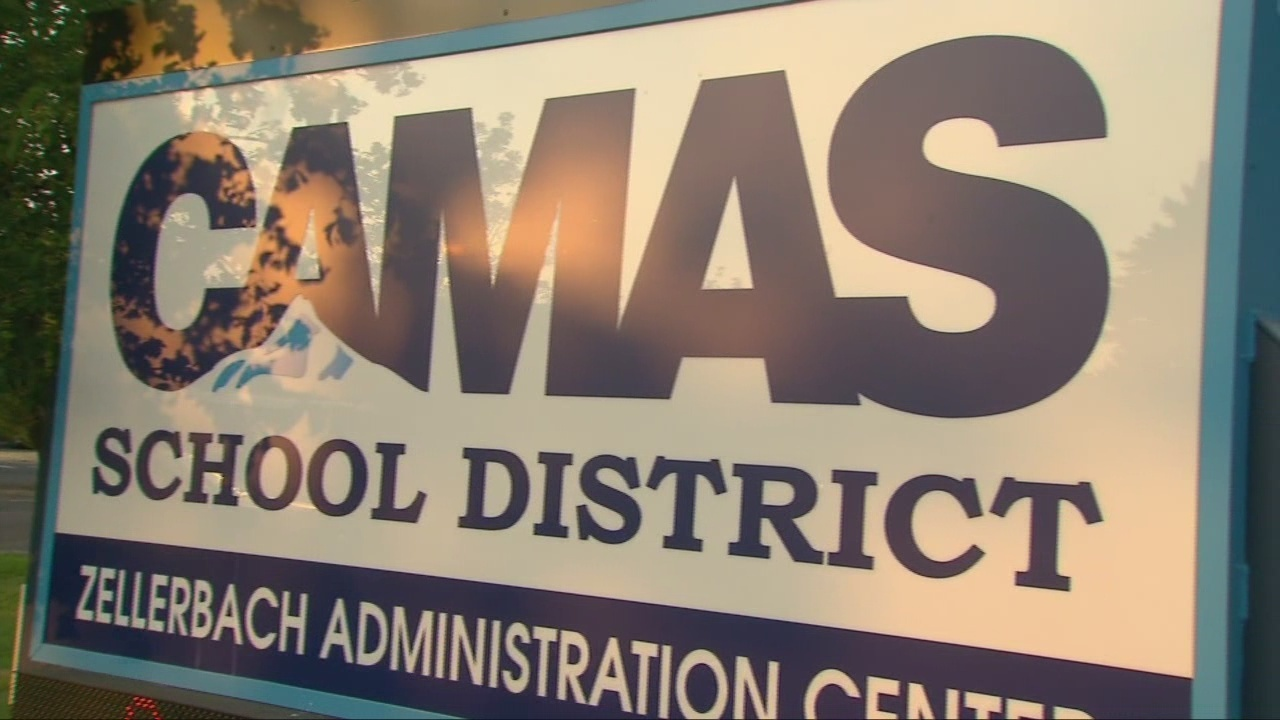
- Camas School District

Address
- 841 NE 22nd Ave. Camas, Washington, 98607; United States
- Coordinates: 45°35′42″N 122°24′11″W

District information
- Type: Public
- Established: 1994; 32 years ago
- Superintendent: John Anzalone
- NCES District ID: 5300810

Other information
- Website: camas.wednet.edu

Camas School District No. 117 is a public school district in Clark County, Washington and serves most of the city of Camas. As of October 2018, the district had a total enrollment of 6,903 total students Camas School District is rated #9 out of 205 of Washington's districts as rated by SchoolDigger.

The district includes the vast majority of Camas and Fern Prairie and parts of Vancouver and Washougal.

== Demographics ==
As of October 2018, Camas School District contained 50.6% male students and 49.4% female students. The ethnicity for Camas School District: 0.3% Native American/Alaskan Native; 7.3% Asian; 0.8% African American; 9.0% Hispanic; 0.2% Native Hawaiian; 74.0% Caucasian; and 8.4% two or more races. The percentage of teachers with at least a master's degree was 83.4%. $10,519 is spent on each student per year, and there is a 89.3% student graduation rate.

The superintendent during 2022 was John Anzalone. Helen Leedom was appointed Assistant Director of Student Services in 2026.

== Schools ==
=== High schools ===
- Camas High School
- Hayes Freedom High School
- Discovery High School

=== Middle schools ===
- Skyridge Middle School
- Liberty Middle School
- Odyssey Middle School

=== Primary schools ===
- Dorothy Fox Elementary School
- Helen Baller Elementary School
- Grass Valley Elementary School
- Lacamas Lake Elementary School
- Prune Hill Elementary School
- Woodburn Elementary School
