= Lacamas Lake =

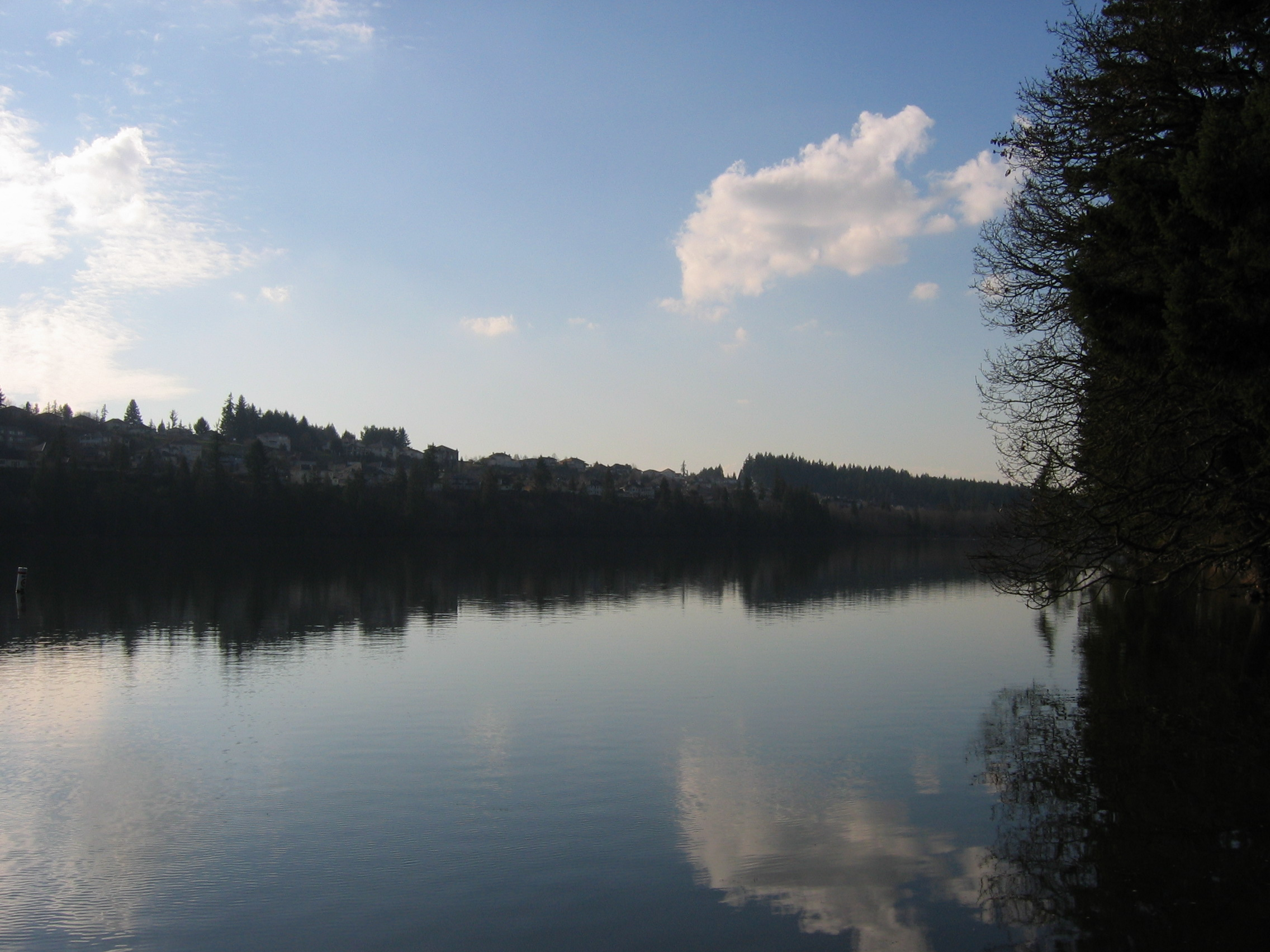
- South side

- Location in Washington
- Location: Clark County, Washington
- Coordinates: 45.62°N 122.43°W
- Type: reservoir
- Catchment area: 67 sq mi (170 km^{2})
- Basin countries: United States
- Max. length: 2.4 mi (3.9 km)
- Max. width: Less than 0.25 mi (0.40 km)
- Max. depth: 60 ft (18 m)
- Surface elevation: 187 ft (57 m)
- Settlements: Camas, Washington

Lacamas Lake is a small lake in Clark County, Washington. It is a popular place to fish and water ski for locals from Vancouver, Camas and Washougal. It connects to Round Lake via a channel that runs under the SR 500 bridge on the southeast side of the lake. In the 1990s many high tech manufacturing plants and expensive housing developments began to appear in the area around the lake. The lake is very warm compared to other lakes in the area and the temperature can drop off quickly with depth. As it is now, the 60-foot-deep (18 m) lake cannot support life below about 18 ft (5.5 m) (see Dead Zone). The Georgia-Pacific Mill in Camas used to draw water from the lake to support its operations; however, Georgia-Pacific donated the two dams on Round Lake to the City of Camas in 2018.

== History ==
The Lacamas Lake Dam was constructed at the south end of Round Lake in 1883. This raised the water level of both lakes by approximately 12 ft (3.7 m).

== Water quality ==
The 43,000 acres (170 km^{2}) around Lacamas Lake and Round Lake collect precipitation and form the Lacamas Creek which feeds into both lakes. This area is mostly large open fields and private farm or ranch land. The resulting runoff contains high levels of fertilizers which leads to nutrient abundance in both lakes. This nutrient abundance and lack of circulation in the lower depths has caused severe algae problems. Consequently, only a few fish species are able to live in either lake (brown trout, rainbow trout, largemouth bass, bluegill, crappie, yellow perch, catfish and white sturgeon. The government classifies the lake as eutrophic.

There have been considerations of using a special aerator for lakes called a "Speece Cone". Other options used to remedy algae issues in eutrophic lakes, include biological means such as dyes, enzymes, and barley hay.

The city of Camas conducts an annual draw down of the lake each fall. The water level of the lake is lowered by approximately 6 feet in order to inspect the dam on the lake for potential repairs. After inspections and repairs take place, the lake is refilled. In the past, lowered water levels during drawdowns have temporarily exacerbated water quality issues in the lake.

== "Dead Zone" ==
One of the reasons the lake cannot support many fish is because of severe pollution from phosphorus, nitrogen, ammonia, as well as lack of circulation to the deeper parts of the lake. This allows a detritus sludge to form that is devoid of oxygen, not allowing the organic compounds to break down efficiently. The phosphorus, nitrogen and ammonia collect in the lake water and the lake bed from polluted streams that run into the lake after passing through farm fields, barnyards and subdivisions.

As it is now, the 2.4-mile (3.9 km)-long lake is murky. The sun warms the top layer of lake water and makes it suitable for warm-water fish such as bass, bluegill and perch. Algae clogs the surface of the lake to a depth of about 18 feet (5.5 m), so no oxygen from the air can penetrate to the deep, cold water at the bottom. The visibility of the lake is usually less than 1-foot (0.30 m). It has very green murky water.

In Autumn, as the Aquatic plants such as Elodea (elodia canadensis) and Algae die, they sink to the bottom and decay, using up still more oxygen, making the colder depths barren and lifeless. The Washington Department of Fish and Wildlife makes the lake more fishable by planting brown or rainbow trout, but few survive year to year.

== Recreational use ==
Lacamas Lake has a 3.5-mile (5.6 km) trail (the Lacamas Heritage Trail) along its entire southern edge. The trail is hard-packed dirt and gravel; it is marked with quarter-mile posts along its entire length. The Lacamas Heritage Trail connects Camas Heritage Park to a parking lot trailhead.

Swimming in Lacamas Lake is popular in the summer due to the warm water temperatures. The City of Camas posts public notices regarding outbreaks of blue green algae. The lake has two boat ramps that on the north side and within Camas Heritage Park. They are also used by personal watercraft (such as jetskis). Lacamas Lake has a posted vessel speed limit of 40 mph (64 km/h) and a number of no-wake restrictions.
