= Round Lake (Clark County, Washington) =

Lake in Clark County, Washington, United States

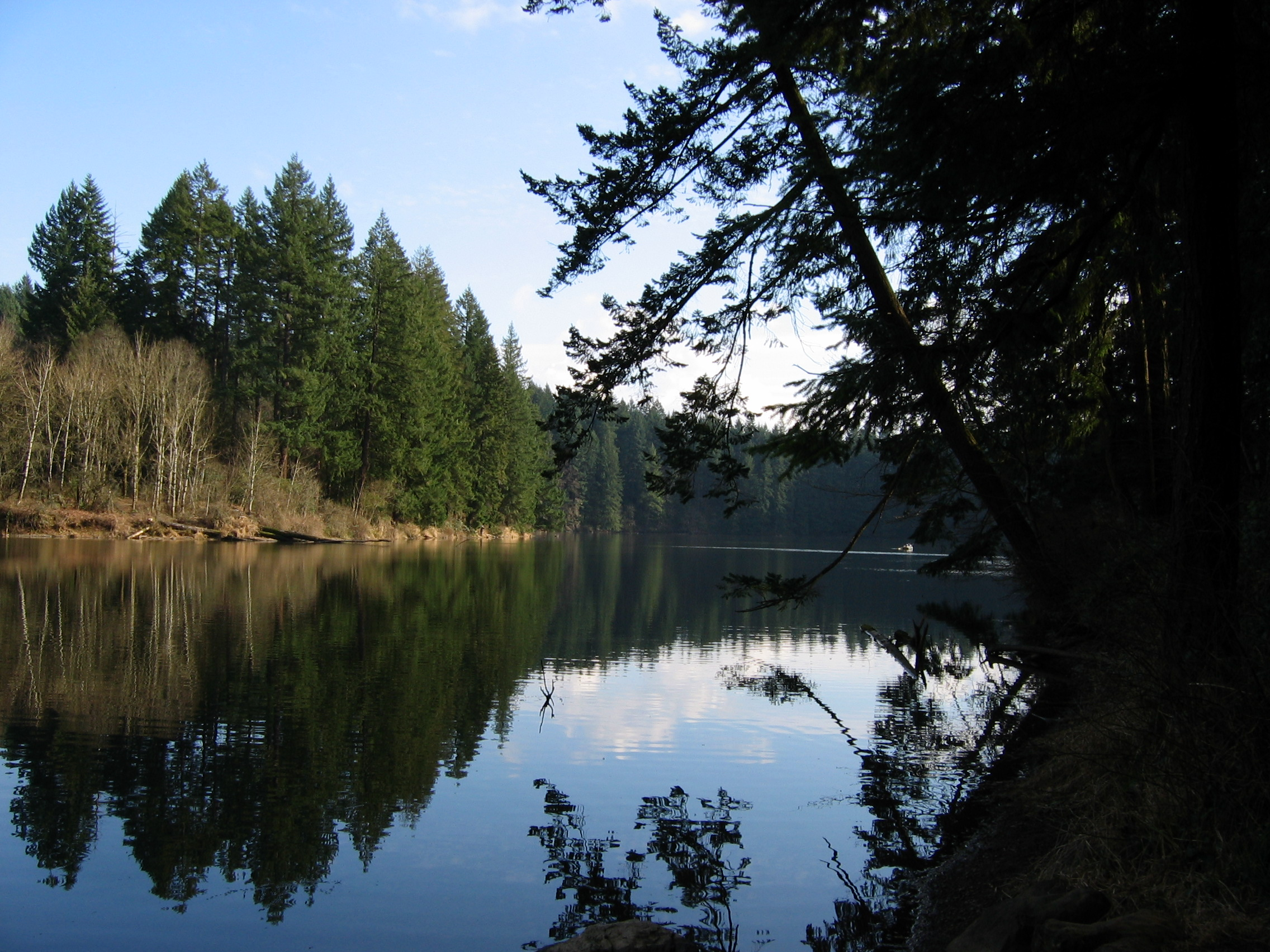

- Location within Washington (state) Location within the United States
- Location: Clark County, Washington, near Camas, Washington
- Coordinates: 45°36′06″N 122°24′13″W
- Primary inflows: Lacamas Creek
- Catchment area: 43,000 acres (170 km^{2})
- Basin countries: United States

Round Lake is a small lake in Camas, Washington, U.S. The lake is connected at its north-west tip to Lacamas Lake and is accessed from Lacamas Park. The park includes a trail that goes entirely around Round Lake, and across the approximately 75-foot (23 m) dam that controls the level of Lacamas Lake and Round Lake. The lake has rainbow trout, brown trout, bluegill and smallmouth bass.

== History ==
Lacamas Creek was first dammed in 1883 for a paper mill—the first to be constructed in Washington Territory. It was replaced by a pair of concrete dams at the southwest end of Round Lake that raised the water level by 12 feet (3.7 m); a diversion tunnel was also constructed to supply the mill with more water. The lake and its surrounding area remained under the control of the mill, which was acquired by Crown Zellerbach in 1925. The company donated 298 acres (121 ha) around Lacamas Lake and Round Lake to the Clark County government in 1963 for the creation of a new park, later named Lacamas Park.

The two lakes were stocked with various species of fish, but they were unable to survive the oxygen-depleted environment created by the high levels of nitrogen, phosphorus, and fecal coliform bacteria that had been produced by nearby dairies and septic tanks. The county government began studying the deteriorating water quality of Lacamas Lake and Round Lake in the 1980s, but were unable to solve the pollution issues at the time.

== Water quality ==
A 43,000-acre (170 km^{2}) watershed forms the Lacamas Creek, which flows into both Lacamas Lake and Round Lake. This water contains a higher than normal amount of pollutants which are rapidly diminishing the water quality of both lakes.
