= Washougal River =

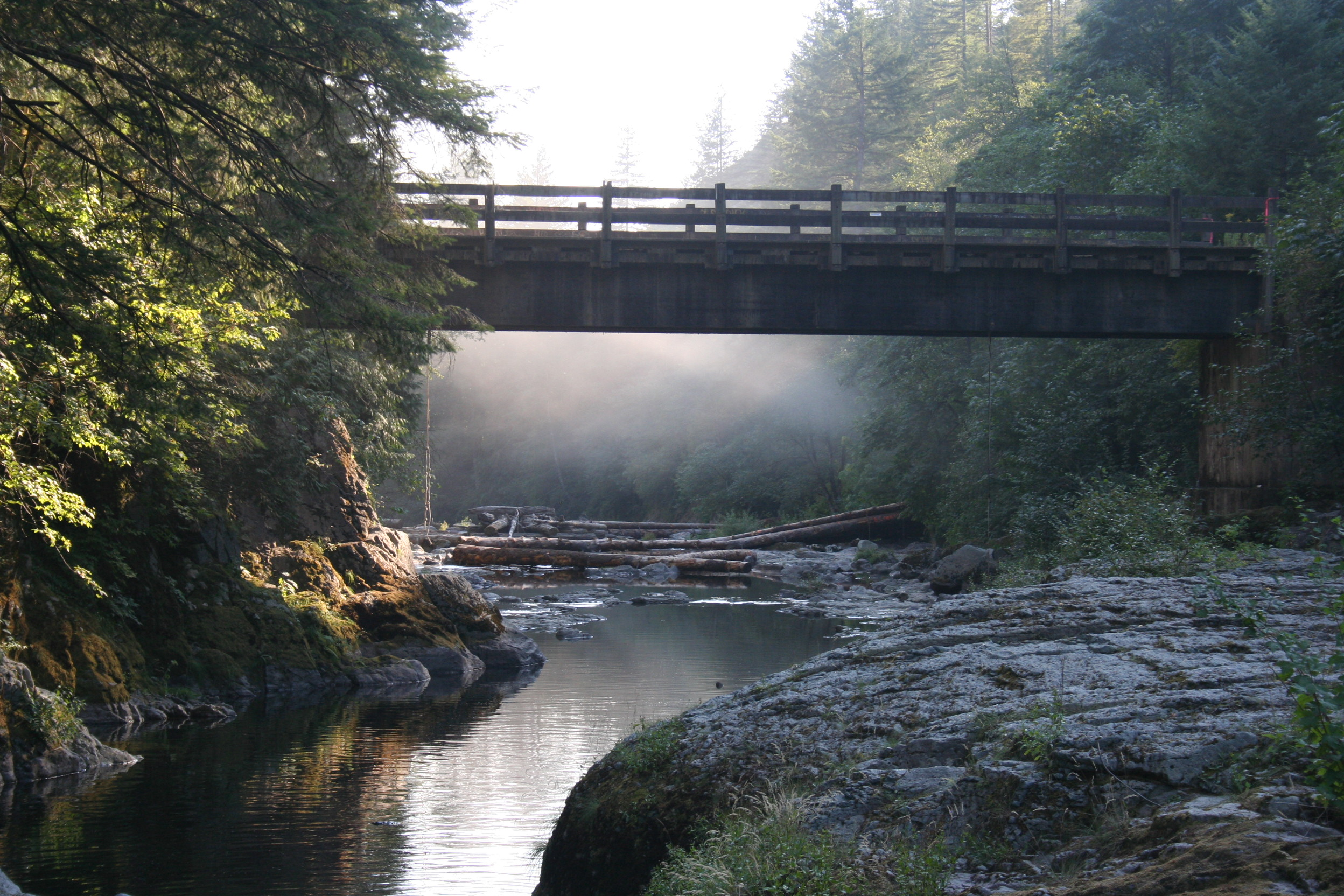
- Flowing under a bridge

- Location of the mouth of Washougal River in Washington Washougal River (the United States)

Location
- Country: United States
- State: Washington
- County: Clark, Skamania

Physical characteristics
- Source: near McKinley Ridge and Lookout Mountain
  - location: Gifford Pinchot National Forest, Skamania County
  - coordinates: 45°47′27″N 122°08′55″W
  - elevation: 2,761 ft (842 m)
- Mouth: Columbia River
  - location: Washougal and Camas, Clark County
  - coordinates: 45°34′43″N 122°24′00″W
  - elevation: 10 ft (3.0 m)
- Length: 33 mi (53 km)
- Basin size: 212 sq mi (550 km^{2})
- Discharge
  - average: 873 cu ft/s (24.7 m^{3}/s)
  - maximum: 40,400 cu ft/s (1,140 m^{3}/s)

The Washougal River is a 33-mile (53 km) tributary of the Columbia River in the U.S. state of Washington. Its headwaters and upper 21 miles (34 km) are in Skamania County in the Gifford Pinchot National Forest, and its lower 12 miles (19 km) are in Clark County. The river, which flows through the city of Washougal and meets the Columbia at the City of Camas, is a popular stream for fishing, swimming, and boating.

Explorers Meriwether Lewis and William Clark referred to the Washougal River as the "Seal River". The name Washougal comes from the Cascades Chinook placename [wasiixwal] or [wasuxal], meaning "rushing water".

== Watershed ==
The Washougal River drains 212 square miles (550 km^{2}) of land that is largely forested, especially in its upper reaches in the Cascade Range and its foothills. Of the total, 162 square miles (420 km^{2}) are in Skamania County, and the remaining 50 square miles (130 km^{2}) are in Clark County. Small farms and rural homes are found along the lower part of the basin, and two small Clark County cities, Camas and Washougal, are at the river mouth. About 63 percent of the watershed is forested; 21 percent is devoted to fields, pastures, bare earth, and shrubland, and 16 percent is developed or cleared for development.

The water quality of surface streams in the basin is rated "excellent" to "good", with a few exceptions. State and county officials monitor the lower reaches of the river for signs of trouble such as harmful bacteria, elevated water temperatures, and bank erosion related to forest clearing and other development. Two of the river's tributaries, Jones Creek and Boulder Creek, supply drinking water to Camas.

The Washougal River, which has no dams on the main stem, had one dam (Kwoneesum Dam) on Wildboy Creek, which is a tributary to the West Fork. Kwoneesum Dam formed a recreational-purpose reservoir for Camp Kwoneesum. The Kwoneesum Dam was removed by the Cowlitz Indian Tribe in 2024.

== Recreation ==
The Washougal River contains significant fisheries: the main stem and some of the tributaries support populations of Chinook, chum, and Coho salmon, steelhead, and coastal cutthroat trout. Dougan Falls, 21 miles (34 km) from the mouth, blocks most fish migration beyond the waterfall. The Washougal River Greenway in Camas has fishing access, a short walking trail, a boat launch, and picnic sites. Much of the recreation access, including Dougan Falls, now requires a Discover Pass, Washington state's recreation fee pass. A separate parking pass is required for Naked Falls, which is on private land and was closed to the public for several years but has now reopened.

A series of waterfalls, some of them associated with swimming holes, are found along the main stream. From lowermost to uppermost, the named falls include Salmon, Dougan, Naked, Reeder, Stebbins Creek, and Docs Drop. Dougan Falls is a total of 30 feet (9.1 m) high and the largest drop is 19 feet (5.8 m).

Whitewater enthusiasts run parts of the Washougal River and some of its tributaries. The runs include many stretches rated 4, 5, or 5+ on the International Scale of River Difficulty.

== See also ==
- List of rivers of Washington (state)
- List of tributaries of the Columbia River
