= Camp Namanu =

Summer camp in the U.S. state of Oregon

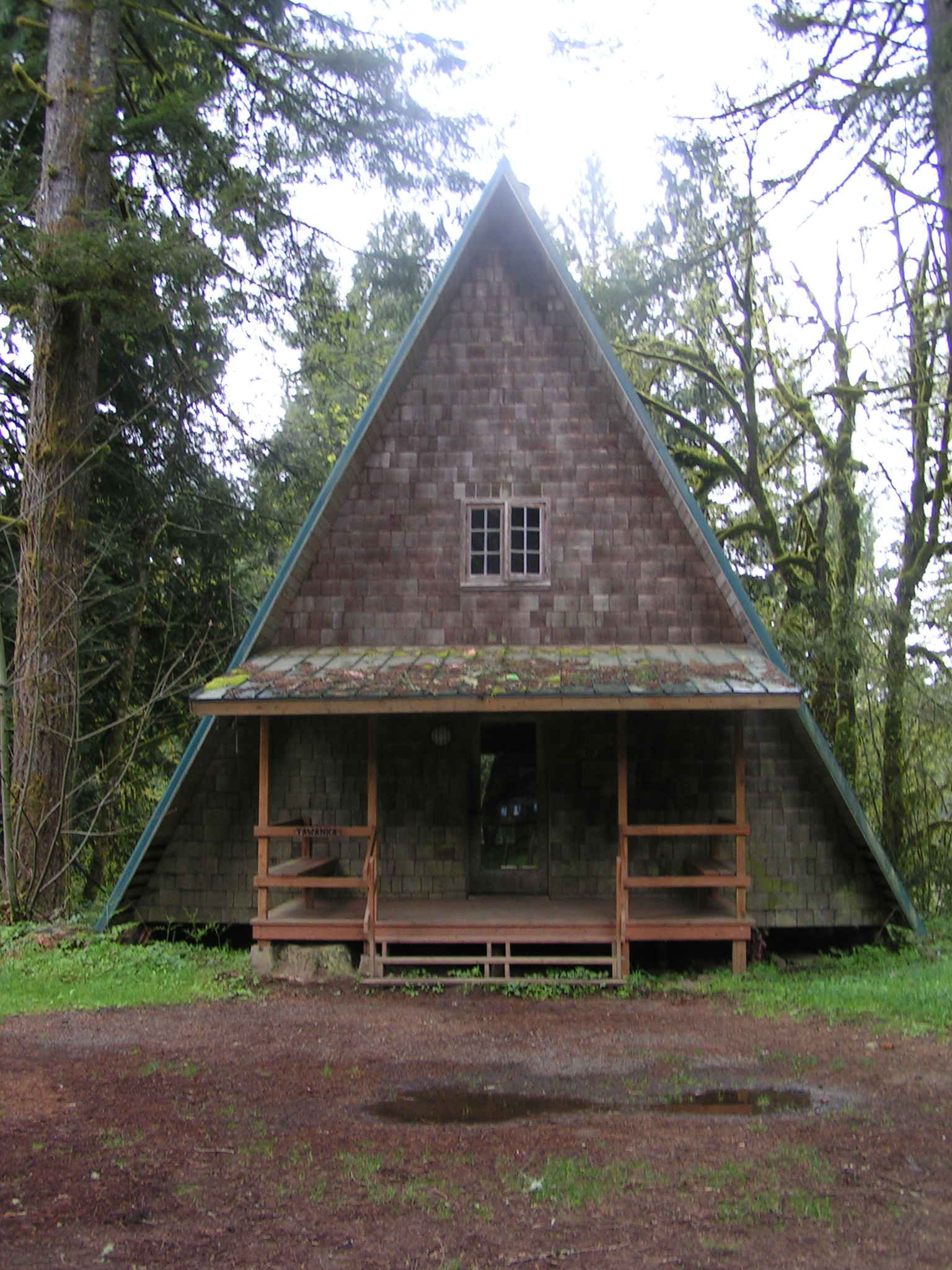
- Summit, the CIT A-frame
- Formation: 1924
- Type: summer camp
- Coordinates: 45.447237°N 122.241306°W
- Region served: Portland metropolitan area
- Owner: Camp Fire Girls
- Website: Official website

Camp Namanu is a summer camp in the U.S. state of Oregon. It was founded as a Camp Fire Girls camp on the banks of the Sandy River in 1924, and is one of the oldest Camp Fire Girls camps in the United States. Today, Namanu covers more than 552 acres (2.23 km^{2}), and is located near the Bull Run Watershed in Sandy, Oregon.

== History ==
During World War II, while Namanu was a girls-only camp, and while local women often worked in shipbuilding, many T2 tankers were made in nearby Portland. One T2 tanker was named the SS Camp Namanu. By the 1950s, Namanu had become one of the largest and oldest Camp Fire Girls camps in the U.S. Namanu remained a "girls only" camp until the late 1970s when the parent organization, now Camp Fire, made the executive decision to include boys in all areas of the program. However, Camp Namanu did not have boys and girls camping together in the same week until the mid-1980s.

In her autobiography, A Girl From Yamhill, children's author Beverly Cleary discussed her time as a Camp Fire Girl including attending Camp Namanu during the 1920s. One of Cleary's popular novel characters, Ramona, is seen sporting a "Camp Namanu" shirt at the beginning of the live-action adaptation movie, Ramona and Beezus. The camp was listed on the National Register of Historic Places in 2024. architect Pietro Belluschi designed four of the buildings at the camp, including Uncle Toby’s Story House.

=== Camp Kwoneesum ===
The Portland Metro Council also operated Camp Kwoneesum northeast of Washougal, Washington. Purchased in 1959, the camp operated from 1965 to 1986. The camp's 1,800 acres (7.3 km^{2}) were sold to Longview Fibre Company in 1987. The camp featured an artificial lake with canoeing and sailing, and more primitive camping than Namanu.

== Other uses ==
The site is used by the Multnomah Education Service District for part of their Outdoor School program.

Camp Namanu also hosts private rentals, weddings and retreats.
