= Fallen Leaf Lake (Washington) =

Lake in Clark County, Washington, United States

- Location within Washington (state) Location within the United States
- Location: Camas, Clark County, Washington
- Coordinates: 45°36′05″N 122°24′38″W
- Basin countries: United States
- Surface elevation: 184 ft (56 m)

Fallen Leaf Lake, once called Dead Lake, is a lake in Camas, Washington. Once home to Dead Lake Cemetery, its graves were moved to Camas Cemetery in 1984.

This property had been owned by the local Camas paper mill for decades. Most recently, the mill was owned by the Georgia-Pacific Corporation, a subsidiary of Koch Industries, Inc. In 2011, the property surrounding Fallen Leaf Lake was purchased from Koch RP Holdings I, LLC by the City of Camas, Washington for use as a city park.
