= Camas Cemetery =

Cemetery in Clark County, Washington, US

Coordinates: 45°35′37″N 122°23′45″W

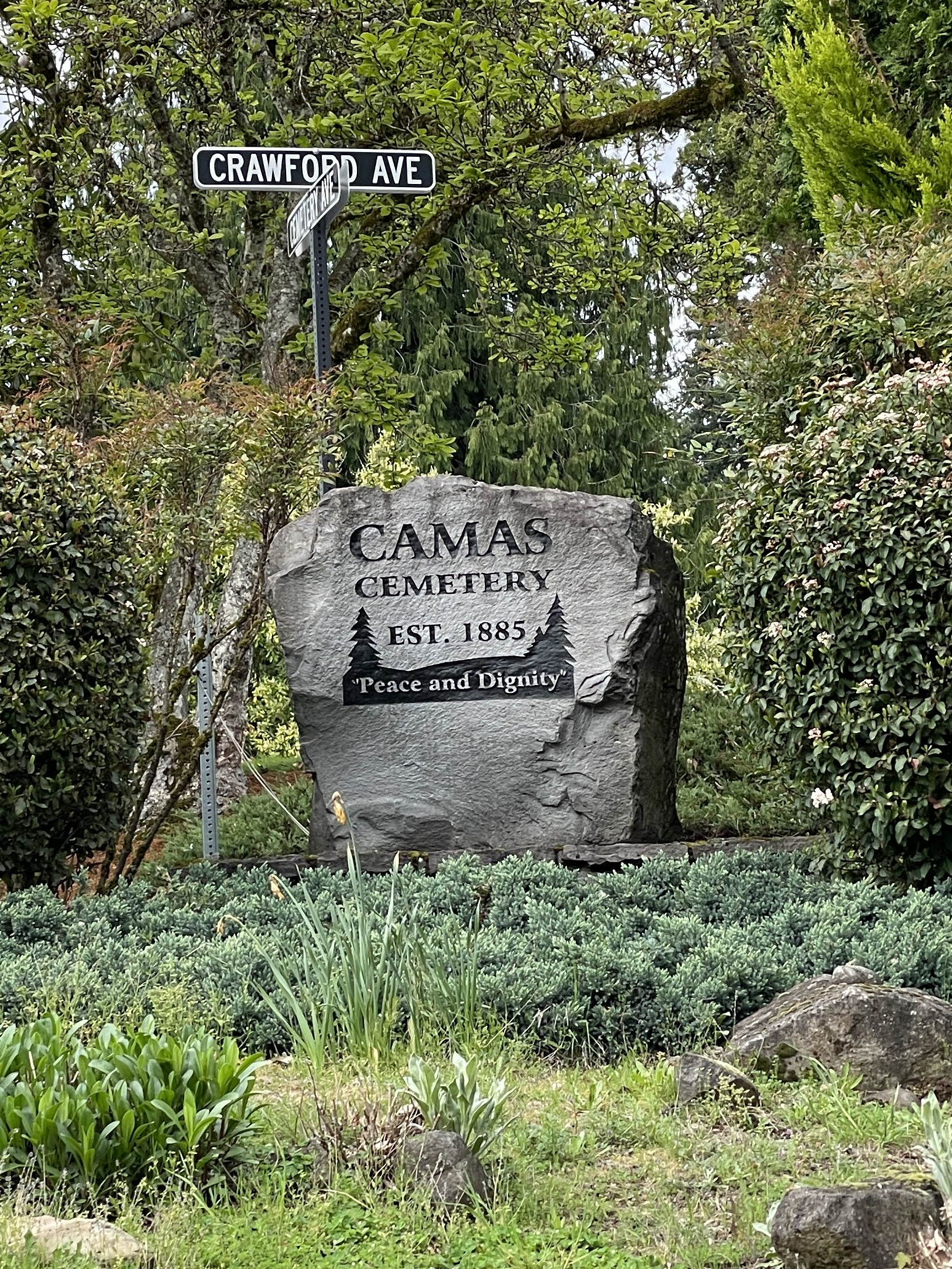
- Camas Cemetery
- Interactive map of Camas Cemetery

Details
- Established: 1860
- Location: Camas, Washington

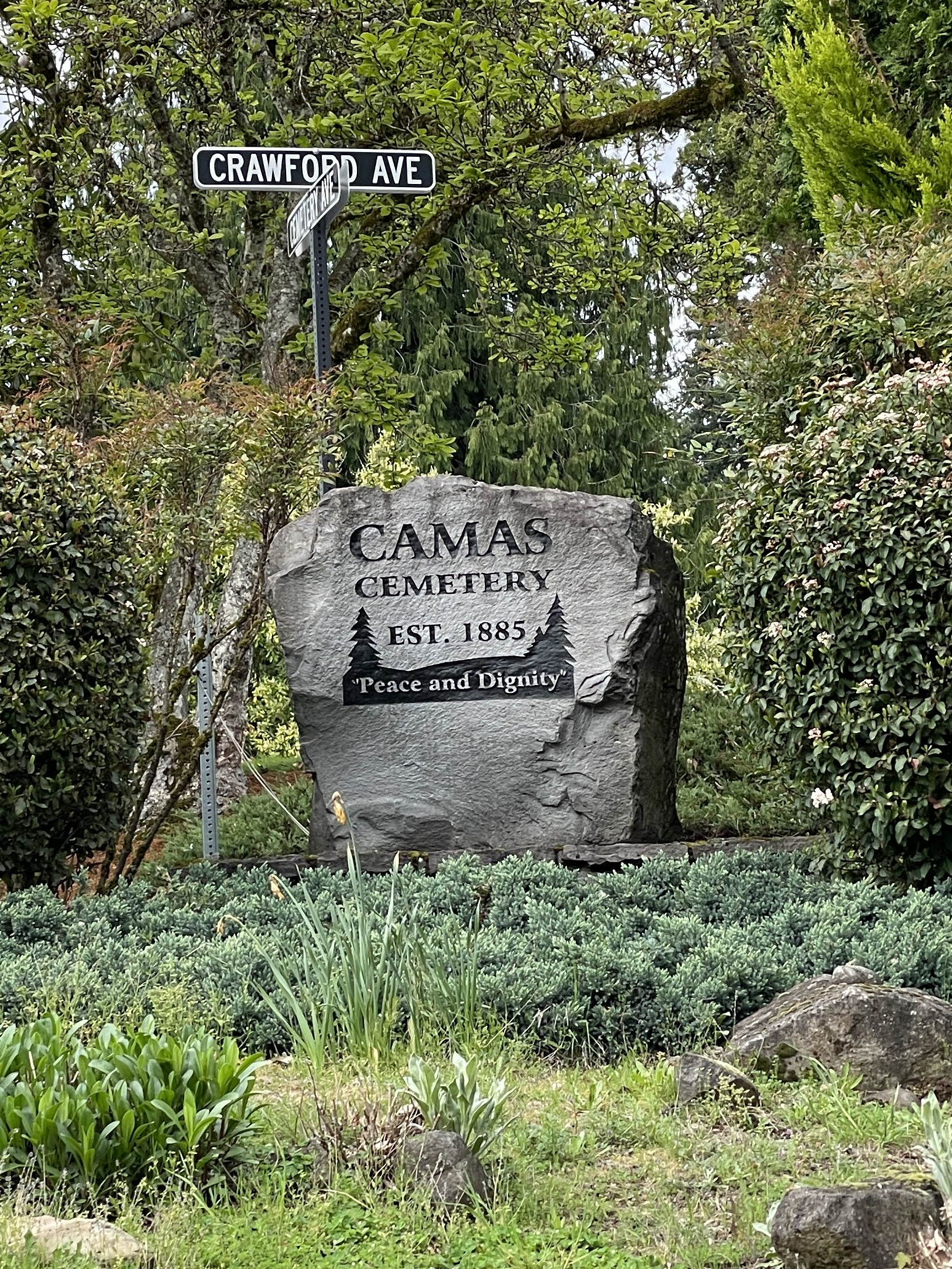
Camas Cemetery

Camas Cemetery is a cemetery in Camas, Washington that was first used in 1860.

The Camas Catholic Cemetery, also known as Dead Lake Cemetery, was located on NE Lake road near Lacamas Lake. In 1984 the graves from there were moved to the new Camas Cemetery and a monument stands now with the names of those moved.
