= Camp Bonneville =

Former US Army post in Washington

Coordinates: 45°41′17″N 122°24′14″W

Camp Bonneville is a former United States Army post located near Vancouver, Washington. It was established in 1909 and used by the U.S. Army as a rifle range and weapons training facility for troops stationed at Fort Vancouver. For several years, Camp Bonneville also housed students participating in outdoor education by local school districts. Camp Bonneville was recommended for closure under the 1995 Base Realignment and Closure Commission and turned over to the Clark County government for re-use as a public park. Cleanup of the 4,000-acre (1,600 ha) site began in the late 2000s, but was halted due to the discovery of toxic chemicals related to military use, including RDX and perchlorate.

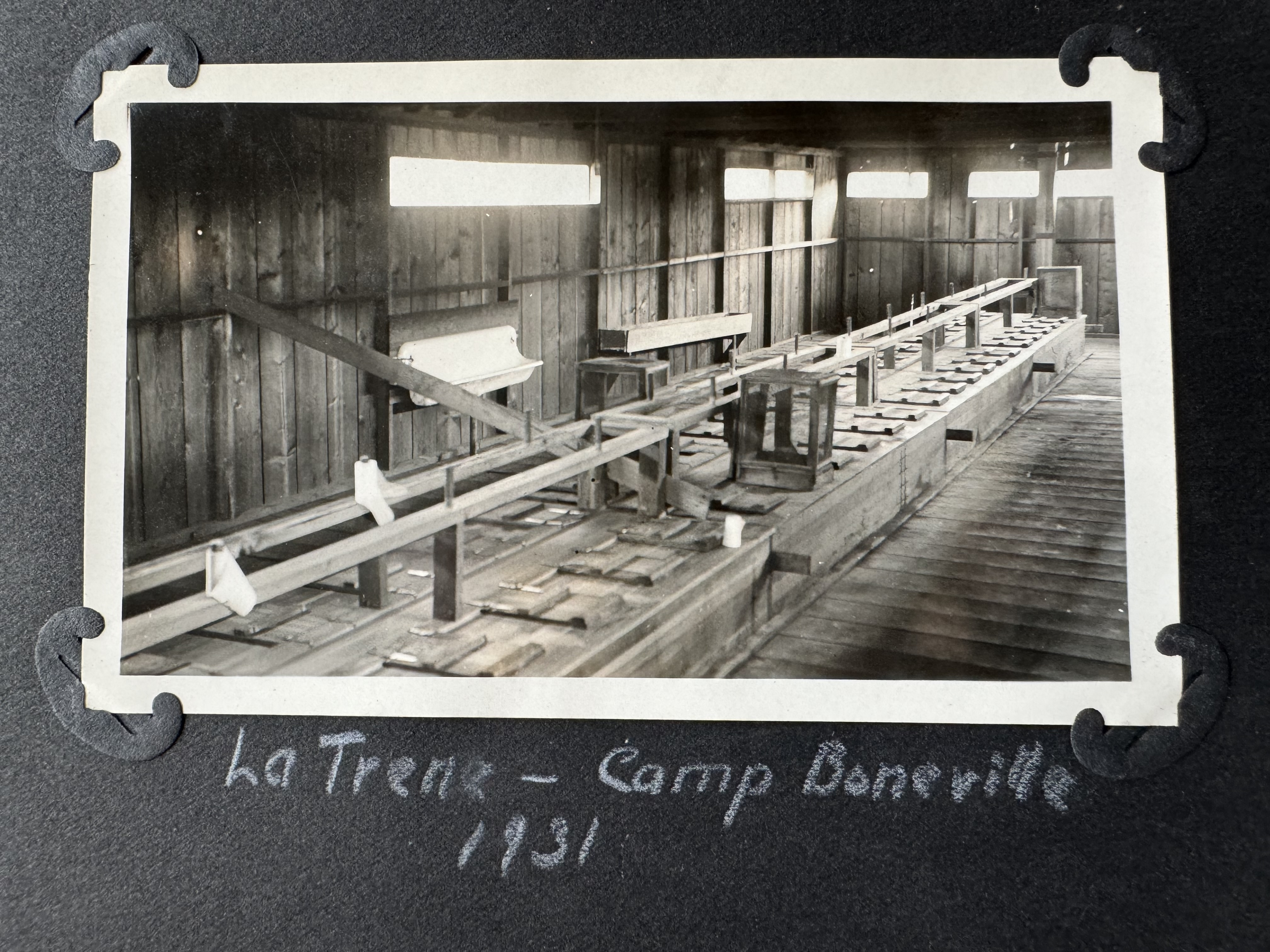
Boneville Latrine 1931 Photo by Ron Johnson
