= Washougal, Washington =

- City
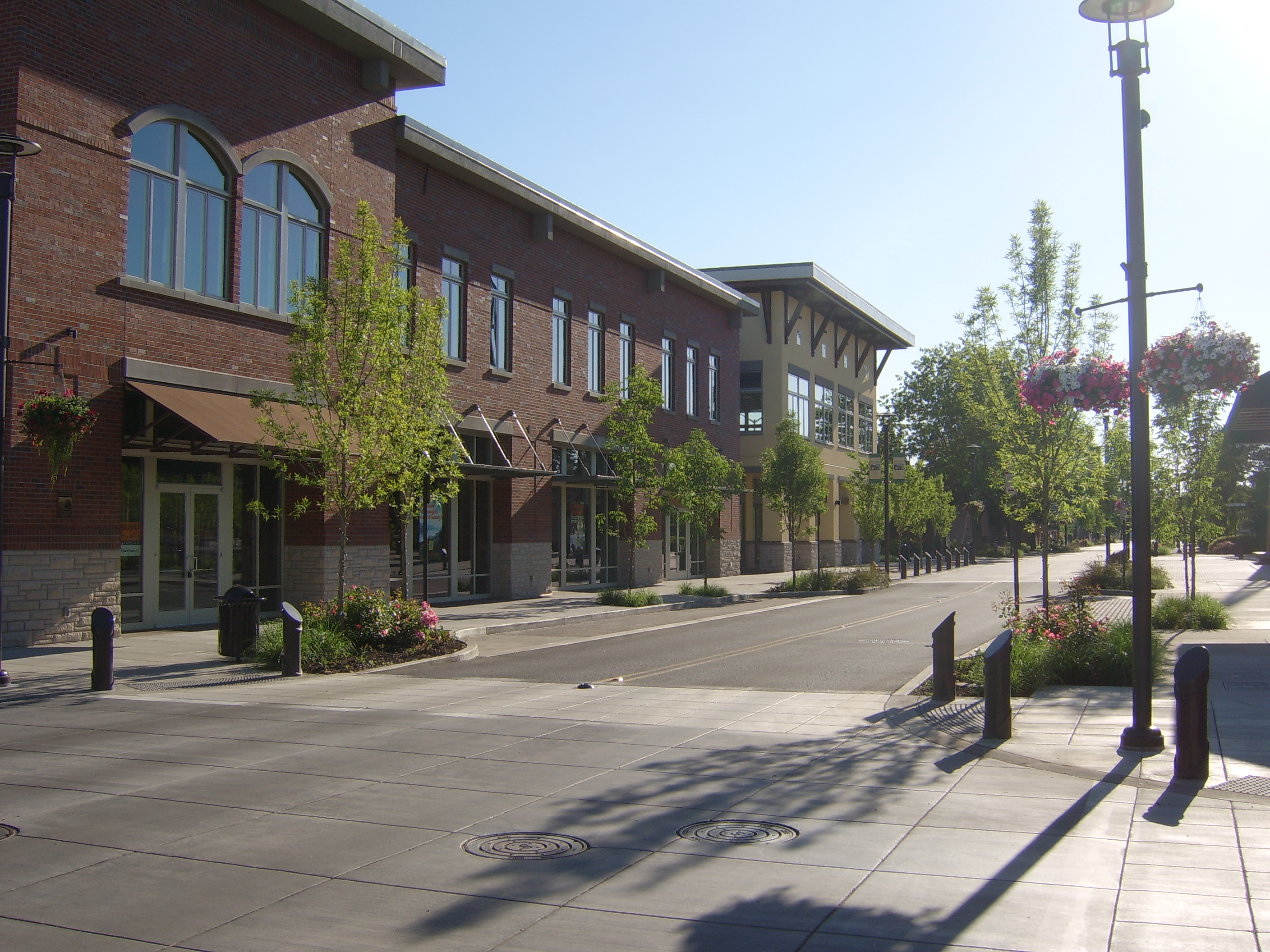
- Downtown Washougal facing west
- Motto: Gateway to the Gorge
- Location of Washougal, Washington
- Coordinates: 45°35′12″N 122°21′43″W
- Country: United States
- State: Washington
- County: Clark

Government
  - Type: Council–manager
  - Mayor: David Stuebe

Area
  - Total: 6.83 sq mi (17.68 km^{2})
  - Land: 5.95 sq mi (15.41 km^{2})
  - Water: 0.88 sq mi (2.27 km^{2})
- Elevation: 82 ft (25 m)

Population (2020)
  - Total: 17,039
  - Estimate (2025): 18,028
  - Density: 2,707.2/sq mi (1,045.24/km^{2})
- Time zone: UTC-8 (PST)
  - Summer (DST): UTC-7 (PDT)
- ZIP Code: 98671
- Area code: 360, 564
- FIPS code: 53-76405
- GNIS feature ID: 2412189
- Website: cityofwashougal.us

Washougal (/wɑːˈʃuːɡəl/ wah-SHOO-gəl) is a city in Clark County, Washington, United States. The population was 17,039 as of the 2020 census.

== Etymology ==
The name Washougal originated from a Chinookan term of disputed meaning that was recorded by fur trader Alexander Ross in 1811 as "Wasough-ally"; other variants included "Washougally", "Washougally Camp", "Wa-Shu-Go", and "Washookal".

== History ==
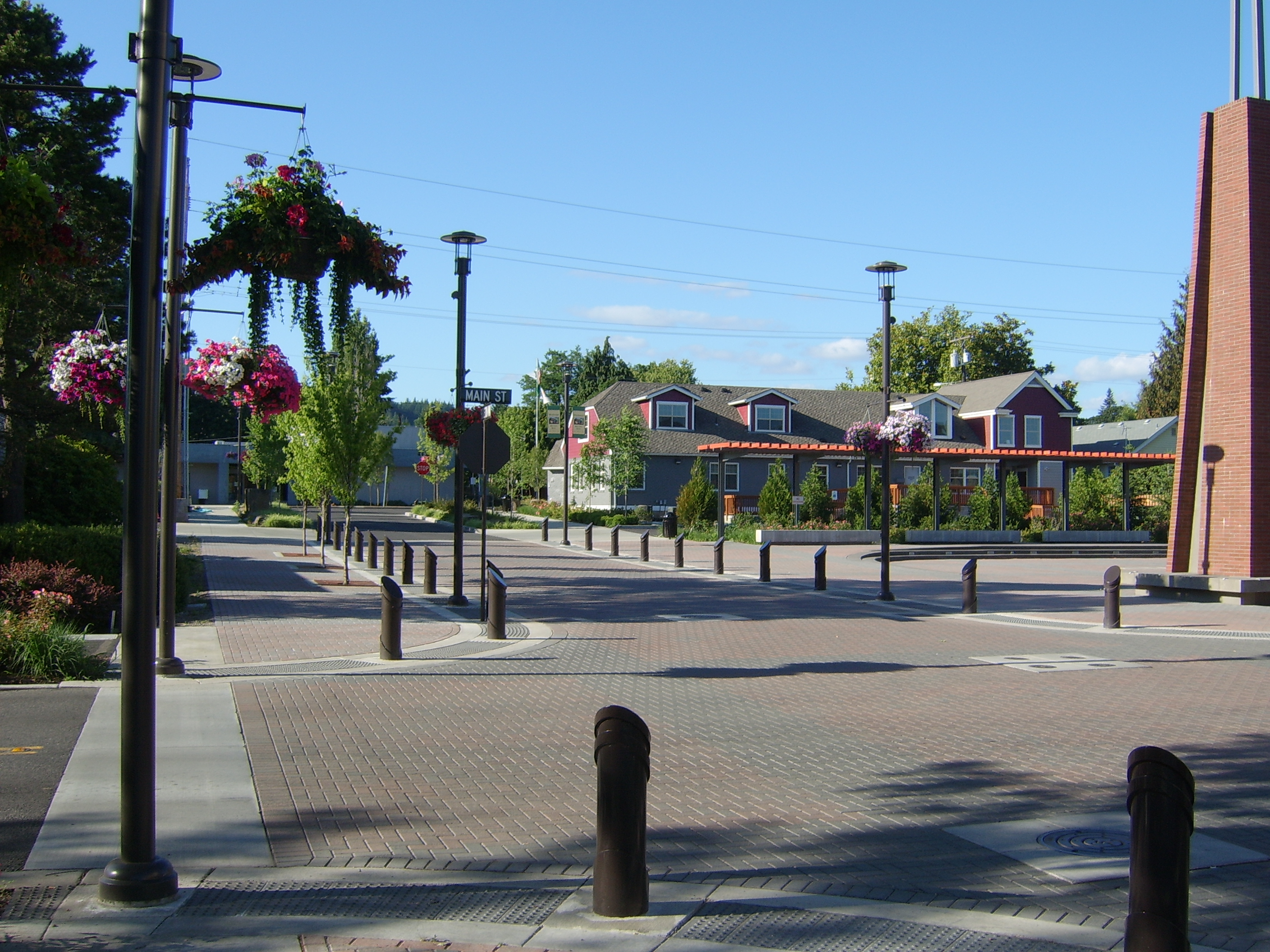
Downtown Washougal facing north

The area around present-day Washougal was originally home to the Watlala, an indigenous Chinookan-speaking group with settlements along the Columbia River. Among the first non-indigenous people to visit the area were the Corps of Discovery led by Meriwether Lewis and William Clark in 1805 and 1806; they camped near the Washougal River during their return voyage in April 1806 and tentatively named it the "Seal River" and "Seacalf River" due to the number of seals they observed in the river.

English sailor Richard Ough (also spelled Howe) built a home in what would become present-day Washougal sometime between 1838 and 1841; he had arrived in the area to work at Fort Vancouver for the Hudson's Bay Company and later married the daughter of Cascade Chinook chief Schluyhus. Ough was followed in 1844 by a cohort led by David C. Parker, who built Parker's Landing and claimed 580 acres (230 ha) under the Donation Land Claim Act; among the settlers was George Bush, among the first African American settlers in the Pacific Northwest. Parker's Landing, later renamed Parkersville, unsuccessfully applied for incorporation in 1852 or 1854; by this time, it had a hotel, bar, and a store and was a trading post along the river. A public school—claimed to be the first American school north of the Columbia River—was established in 1852–53. A portion of Ough's own claim was sold to Joseph E. C. Durgin, who established a townsite in 1880 that was named Washougal; the new settlement overtook Parkersville and was platted on May 6, 1880.

Washougal was connected to the Spokane, Portland and Seattle Railway in 1908 and was incorporated in November of that year. In 1910, a textile mill opened in the town and grew to become a major part of the area's economy; it was acquired by Pendleton Woolen Mills two years later. A new east–west highway along the Columbia River (now part of State Route 14) opened in 1927 and aided development of summer homes and recreation areas near Washougal. In the mid-to-late 20th century, Washougal became a bedroom community for workers in Vancouver and Portland, but grew slower than neighboring Camas. Its Mount Pleasant Grange Hall is the oldest continually used grange hall in Washington.

== Geography ==
Washougal is located 18 miles (29 km) east of Vancouver on the north bank of the Columbia River. It is bordered to the west by Camas and connected to other cities via State Route 14. The Washougal River, a tributary of the Columbia, runs along the north side of downtown and separates the city from neighboring Camas. Washougal is the southernmost incorporated place in Washington state.

According to the United States Census Bureau, the city has a total area of 6.30 square miles (16.32 km^{2}), of which, 5.42 square miles (14.04 km^{2}) is land and 0.88 square miles (2.28 km^{2}) is water.

=== Climate ===
This region experiences warm (but not hot) and dry summers, with no average monthly temperatures above 71.6 °F (22 °C). According to the Köppen Climate Classification system, Washougal has a warm-summer Mediterranean climate, abbreviated "Csb" on climate maps.

Climate data for Washougal, Washington (1975–present)
Month	Jan	Feb	Mar	Apr	May	Jun	Jul	Aug	Sep	Oct	Nov	Dec	Year
Record high °F (°C)	64 (18)	72 (22)	82 (28)	89 (32)	100 (38)	105 (41)	108 (42)	107 (42)	105 (41)	93 (34)	71 (22)	64 (18)	108 (42)
Mean daily maximum °F (°C)	45.0 (7.2)	49.7 (9.8)	54.9 (12.7)	59.6 (15.3)	66.7 (19.3)	72.2 (22.3)	79.4 (26.3)	79.9 (26.6)	74.4 (23.6)	63.6 (17.6)	51.4 (10.8)	44.5 (6.9)	61.8 (16.6)
Daily mean °F (°C)	37.7 (3.2)	40.9 (4.9)	44.3 (6.8)	47.7 (8.7)	53.5 (11.9)	58.6 (14.8)	63.4 (17.4)	63.3 (17.4)	58.6 (14.8)	50.8 (10.4)	43.1 (6.2)	37.8 (3.2)	50.0 (10.0)
Mean daily minimum °F (°C)	30.5 (−0.8)	32.0 (0.0)	33.7 (0.9)	35.8 (2.1)	40.3 (4.6)	45.0 (7.2)	47.5 (8.6)	46.7 (8.2)	42.8 (6.0)	38.0 (3.3)	34.9 (1.6)	31.2 (−0.4)	38.2 (3.4)
Record low °F (°C)	5 (−15)	3 (−16)	15 (−9)	21 (−6)	22 (−6)	29 (−2)	32 (0)	33 (1)	26 (−3)	17 (−8)	11 (−12)	—	3 (−16)
Average precipitation inches (mm)	12.2 (310)	9.1 (230)	8.4 (210)	6.7 (170)	5.1 (130)	4.0 (100)	1.2 (30)	1.9 (48)	3.6 (91)	6.8 (170)	12.2 (310)	13.0 (330)	84.2 (2,140)
Average snowfall inches (cm)	3.3 (8.4)	1.6 (4.1)	0.5 (1.3)	0.0 (0.0)	0.0 (0.0)	0.0 (0.0)	0.0 (0.0)	0.0 (0.0)	0.0 (0.0)	0.0 (0.0)	1.0 (2.5)	3.6 (9.1)	10.0 (25)
Average precipitation days (≥ 0.01 in.)	20	17	20	19	15	11	6	6	9	15	21	21	180
Average snowy days (≥ 0.1 in.)	1.6	0.9	0.3	0.0	0.0	0.0	0.0	0.0	0.0	0.0	0.4	1.6	4.8
Source: Weatherbase

== Demographics ==
Historical population
Census	Pop.	Note	%±
1910	456		—
1920	765		67.8%
1930	1,206		57.6%
1940	1,267		5.1%
1950	1,577		24.5%
1960	2,672		69.4%
1970	3,388		26.8%
1980	3,834		13.2%
1990	4,764		24.3%
2000	8,595		80.4%
2010	14,095		64.0%
2020	17,039		20.9%
2025 (est.)	18,028		5.8%
U.S. Decennial Census; 2020 Census

=== 2020 census ===
As of the 2020 census, Washougal had a population of 17,039. The median age was 39.8 years. 24.3% of residents were under the age of 18, 4.9% were under 5, and 16.0% were 65 years of age or older. For every 100 females there were 97.2 males, and for every 100 females age 18 and over there were 94.5 males age 18 and over.

The population density was 2,863.7 inhabitants per square mile.

99.8% of residents lived in urban areas, while 0.2% lived in rural areas.

There were 6,251 households in Washougal, of which 35.9% had children under the age of 18 living in them. Of all households, 55.8% were married-couple households, 15.0% were households with a male householder and no spouse or partner present, and 21.1% were households with a female householder and no spouse or partner present. About 18.9% of all households were made up of individuals, and 8.6% had someone living alone who was 65 years of age or older. The average household size was 2.76.

There were 6,444 housing units, of which 3.0% were vacant. The homeowner vacancy rate was 0.9% and the rental vacancy rate was 3.0%.

Racial composition as of the 2020 census
Race	Number	Percent
White	14,043	82.4%
Black or African American	203	1.2%
American Indian and Alaska Native	148	0.9%
Asian	387	2.3%
Native Hawaiian and Other Pacific Islander	56	0.3%
Some other race	489	2.9%
Two or more races	1,713	10.1%
Hispanic or Latino (of any race)	1,423	8.4%

=== 2010 census ===
As of the 2010 census, there were 14,095 people, 5,256 households, and 3,824 families residing in the city. The population density was 2,600.6 inhabitants per square mile (1,004.1/km^{2}). There were 5,673 housing units at an average density of 1,046.7 per square mile (404.1/km^{2}). The racial makeup of the city was 90.3% White, 0.6% African American, 1.0% Native American, 2.4% Asian, 0.2% Pacific Islander, 1.7% from other races, and 3.8% from two or more races. Hispanic or Latino of any race were 14.3% of the population.

There were 5,256 households, of which 38.0% had children under the age of 18 living with them, 55.3% were married couples living together, 12.0% had a female householder with no husband present, 5.4% had a male householder with no wife present, and 27.2% were non-families. 20.6% of all households were made up of individuals, and 7% had someone living alone who was 65 years of age or older. The average household size was 2.68 and the average family size was 3.07.

The median age in the city was 36.1 years. 26.9% of residents were under the age of 18; 7.7% were between the ages of 18 and 24; 28.1% were from 25 to 44; 27.1% were from 45 to 64; and 10.1% were 65 years of age or older. The gender makeup of the city was 49.7% male and 50.3% female.

=== 2000 census ===
As of the 2000 census, there were 8,595 people, 3,294 households, and 2,325 families residing in the city. The population density was 1,734.5 inhabitants per square mile (669.7/km^{2}). There were 3,463 housing units at an average density of 698.8 per square mile (269.8/km^{2}). The racial makeup of the city was 94.0% White, 0.4% African American, 1.26% Native American, 0.78% Asian, 0.12% Pacific Islander, 0.83% from other races, and 2.56% from two or more races. Hispanic or Latino of any race were 2.51% of the population. 16.0% were of German, 10.7% English, 8.5% American, 7.4% Irish, 5.5% European and 5.1% Norwegian ancestry. 95.8% spoke English and 2.5% Spanish as their first language.

There were 3,294 households, out of which 37.9% had children under the age of 18 living with them, 51.3% were married couples living together, 14.1% had a female householder with no husband present, and 29.4% were non-families. 23.6% of all households were made up of individuals, and 8.3% had someone living alone who was 65 years of age or older. The average household size was 2.61 and the average family size was 3.05.

In the city, the age distribution of the population shows 29.8% under the age of 18, 8.3% from 18 to 24, 30.1% from 25 to 44, 20.6% from 45 to 64, and 11.2% who were 65 years of age or older. The median age was 34 years. For every 100 females, there were 96.3 males. For every 100 females age 18 and over, there were 91.7 males.

The median income for a household in the city was $38,719, and the median income for a family was $52,293. Males had a median income of $37,351 versus $26,032 for females. The per capita income for the city was $19,389. About 8.3% of families and 9.7% of the population were below the poverty line, including 13.8% of those under age 18 and 3.6% of those age 65 or over.

== Parks and recreation ==
Washougal is home to several recreational areas and public parks. Of these, Angelo Park, Beaver Park, Campen Creek Park, and Hathaway Park are four large municipal parks located in Washougal. There is also recreational fishing on the Washougal River, where steelhead trout and salmon flourish.

== Education ==
Most of Washougal is in the Washougal School District. Some parts are in the Camas School District.

== Sister City ==
Washougal has the following Sister city:

- Zielonki, Poland (2023-)

== Notable people ==
- Marie Gluesenkamp Perez, U.S. representative
- Isaiah Franco, college student at Hamilton College
