= Camas, Washington =

- City
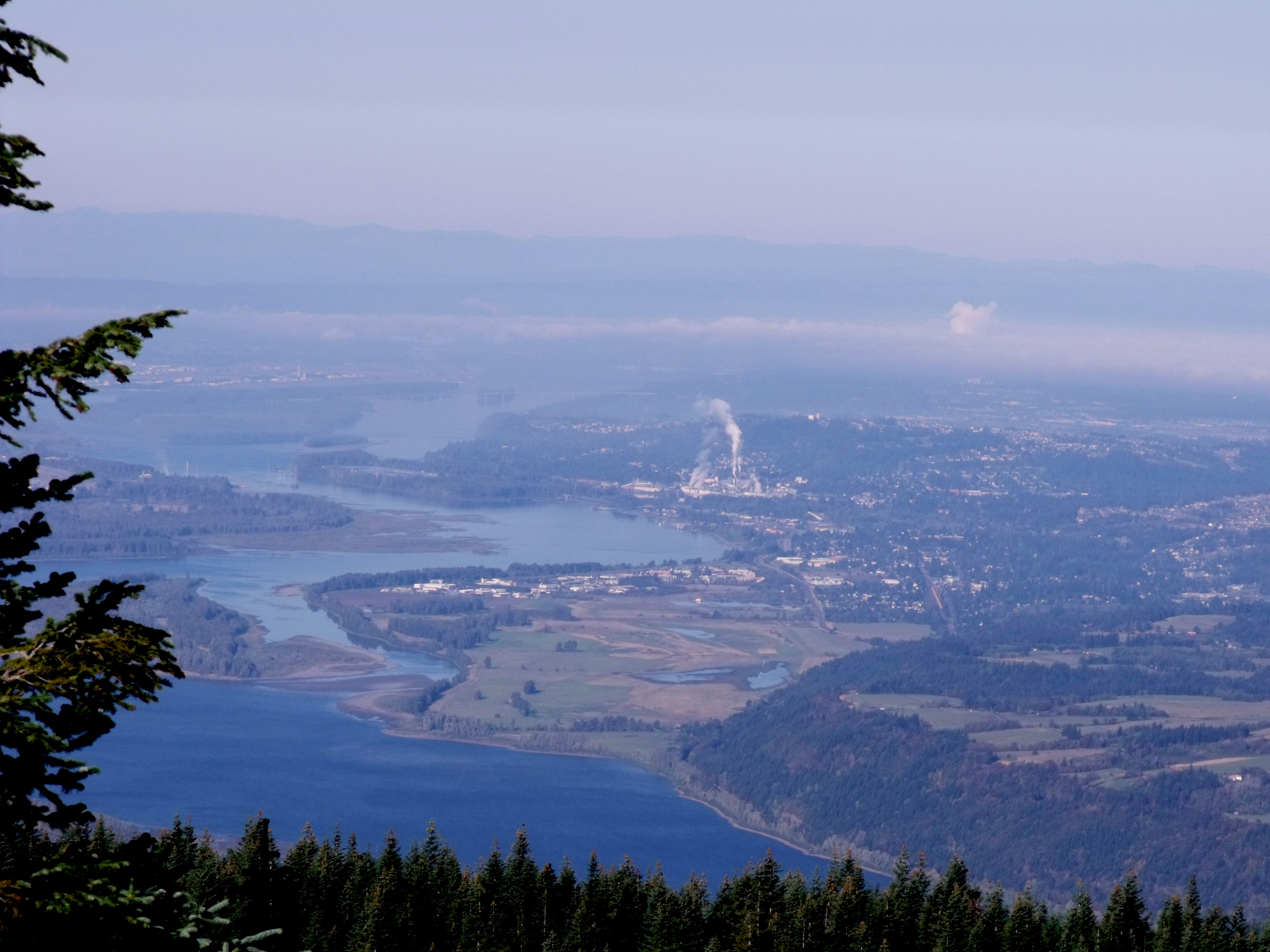
- Aerial view of Camas and the Columbia River, looking northwest
- Interactive map of Camas, Washington
- Coordinates: 45°36′28″N 122°25′44″W
- Country: United States
- State: Washington
- County: Clark

Government
  - Type: Mayor–council
  - Mayor: Steve Hogan

Area
  - Total: 16.35 sq mi (42.3 km^{2})
  - Land: 14.19 sq mi (36.8 km^{2})
  - Water: 2.16 sq mi (5.6 km^{2})
- Elevation: 712 ft (217 m)

Population (2020)
  - Total: 26,065
  - Estimate (2025): 27,749
  - Density: 1,734.9/sq mi (669.84/km^{2})
- Demonym: Camasonian
- Time zone: UTC-8 (PST)
  - Summer (DST): UTC-7 (PDT)
- ZIP code: 98607
- Area code: 360, 564
- FIPS code: 53-09480
- GNIS feature ID: 2409967
- Website: cityofcamas.us

Camas /ˈkæməs/ is a city in Clark County, Washington, with a population of 26,065 at the 2020 census. The east side of town borders the city of Washougal, Washington, and the west side of town borders Vancouver, Washington. Camas lies along the Washington side of the Columbia River, across from Troutdale, Oregon, and is part of the Portland metropolitan area.

One of the major geographical features of the city is Prune Hill. Prune Hill is an extinct volcanic vent and is part of the Boring Lava Field of northwest Oregon and southwest Washington.

== History ==
Officially incorporated on June 18, 1906, the city is named after the camas lily, a plant with an onion-like bulb prized by Native Americans. A paper mill was first established in the city in 1883 with the support of Henry Pittock, a wealthy entrepreneur from England who had settled in Portland, Oregon, where he published The Oregonian. As of 2026, it has been in continuous operation for more than 140 years. At the west end of downtown Camas is the large Georgia-Pacific paper mill from which Camas High School sports teams get their name, "the Papermakers".

By 1971, there had been four attempts to merge Camas and Washougal that were denied by voters.

=== Mill history ===
Pittock's LaCamas Colony bought 2,600 acres in 1883, forming the Columbia River Paper Company the following year to begin production in 1885, before merging with Oregon City's Crown Paper Company to form Crown Columbia Paper in 1905. After converting from steam to electricity in 1913, Crown merged with Willamette Paper in 1914 and then with Zellerbach Paper in 1928. Crown Zellerbach became the largest paper manufacturer on the west coast and the Camas mill the largest of its type in the world.

During World War II, the Camas mill temporarily manufactured parts and components for US Naval vessels produced at the nearby Kaiser Shipyards. In 1950, the Camas mill was the first factory to produce folded paper napkins. "Crown Z" was the area's biggest employer in 1971, with 2,643 of approximately 3,700 Clark County paper mill workers. In 1986, Crown Zellerbach was absorbed by James River Corporation; after further mergers with the Fort Howard Paper Company in 1997 and Georgia-Pacific in 2000, Koch Industries acquired Georgia-Pacific and the Camas mill in 2005. In 2018, Koch announced plans to lay off approximately 200–300 workers, shutting down all equipment related to communications paper, fine paper conversion, and pulping operations.

Historically, the commercial base of the city was almost entirely the paper mill; in recent years, however, the diversity of industries in and near Camas has been enhanced considerably by the influx of several high-tech, white-collar companies. These include Hewlett-Packard, Linear Technology, WaferTech, and Underwriters Laboratories.

As of 2026, plans to demolish the mill have proceeded, and work is expected to finish by 2027. The area is expected to become a waterfront on the Camas Slough (a small offshoot of the Columbia River) and will be an expansion to the existing Downtown District.

== Geography ==
As of 2024, the city had a total area of 16.35 square miles (42.35 km^{2}), of which 14.19 square miles (36.75 km^{2}) was land and 2.16 square miles (5.59 km^{2}) was water. There are numerous bodies of water within the city limits, including Lacamas Lake, Lacamas Creek, Round Lake, Fallen Leaf Lake, Tug Lake, the Washougal River, and the Columbia River.

Camas is approximately 20 miles (32 km) northeast of Portland, Oregon.

== Government ==
The City of Camas operates as a mayor–council government with an elected mayor and 7 elected council members, who appoint an administrator to supervise operations, including emergency services, judicial services, public parks and utilities, and a cemetery. As of 2024, the city operated on a $153 million budget and employed approximately 267 staff members.

== Arts and culture ==
Annual events include the summer "Camas Days", as well as other festivals and celebrations.

== Parks and recreation ==
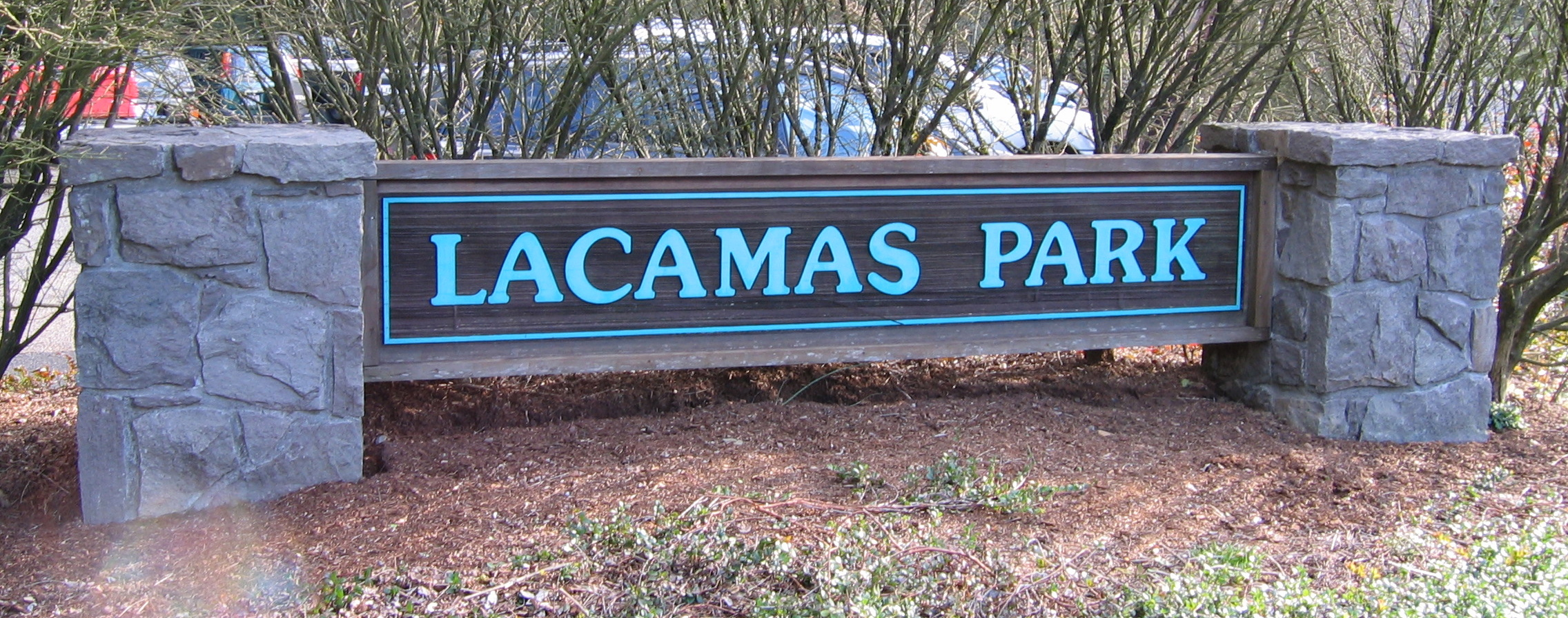
Entrance sign at Lacamas Park

There are numerous parks in Camas and within the Camas area, including:

- Crown Park
- Dorothy Fox Park
- Fallen Leaf Park
- Forest Home Park
- Goot Park
- Grass Valley Park
- Louis Bloch Park
- Oak Park
- Prune Hill Sports Park
- Skate Park
- Lacamas Heritage Trail Park

Lacamas Park encompasses Round Lake and runs against SR 500 on its west side. Across SR 500 is Lacamas Lake. The park is open year-round and includes barbecues, a playground, trails around the park and lake, and access to the Camas Potholes. The park includes trails which lead to the Camas Potholes and the Camas lily fields, as well as a 1.2-mile (1.9 km) loop around Round Lake. Water activities in Round Lake are also common around summer time. Bathrooms are available on a seasonal basis only.

Heritage Park has facilities for launching boats into Lacamas Lake, a playground, much open field, and trails through the trees. The parking lot is large and includes numerous long parking stalls to accommodate vehicles with trailers.

== Economy ==
=== Employment ===
As of 2024, Camas had an unemployment rate of 4.5%; the top employers were:

Rank	Employer	Employees in 2024	Employees in 2015	2024 Share	2015 Share
1	Fisher Investment	▲1,771	975	▲19.6%	13.0%
2	Camas School District	▲1,011	811	▲11.2%	10.9%
3	TSMC Washington (Wafertech)	▼1,000	1,050	▼11.1%	14.1%
4	Analog Devices (Linear Technology)	▲349	292	3.9%	3.9%
5	nLight Technology	▲273	189	▲3.0%	2.5%
6	City of Camas	▲268	-	▲3.0%	-
7	Sigma Design	▼261	450	▼2.9%	6.0%
8	Plexsys	▲174	-	▲1.9%	-
9	Georgia Pacific	▲150	-	▲1.7%	-
10	Fuel Medical	▲111	-	▲1.2%	-

== Demographics ==
Historical population
Census	Pop.	Note	%±
1890	417		—
1910	1,125		—
1920	1,843		63.8%
1930	4,230		129.5%
1940	4,433		4.8%
1950	4,725		6.6%
1960	5,666		19.9%
1970	6,050		6.8%
1980	5,681		−6.1%
1990	6,442		13.4%
2000	12,534		94.6%
2010	19,355		54.4%
2020	26,065		34.7%
2025 (est.)	27,749		6.5%
U.S. Decennial Census; 2020 Census

=== Racial and ethnic composition ===
Racial composition as of the 2020 census
Race	Number	Percentage
White	19,896	76.3%
Black or African American	273	1.0%
American Indian and Alaska Native	117	0.4%
Asian	2,574	9.9%
Native Hawaiian and Other Pacific Islander	64	0.2%
Some other race	506	1.9%
Two or more races	2,635	10.1%
Hispanic or Latino (of any race)	1,880	7.2%

=== 2020 census ===
As of the 2020 census, Camas had a population of 26,065 and the median age was 39.3 years. 28.8% of residents were under the age of 18, 12.5% were 65 years of age or older, for every 100 females there were 97.3 males, and for every 100 females age 18 and over there were 95.0 males.

The population density was 1,851.9 people per square mile. 98.3% of residents lived in urban areas, while 1.7% lived in rural areas.

There were 8,834 households in Camas, of which 45.9% had children under the age of 18 living in them, 66.7% were married-couple households, 10.9% were households with a male householder and no spouse or partner present, and 17.0% were households with a female householder and no spouse or partner present. About 15.7% of all households were made up of individuals and 7.3% had someone living alone who was 65 years of age or older.

There were 9,234 housing units, of which 4.3% were vacant; the homeowner vacancy rate was 1.7% and the rental vacancy rate was 4.9%.

=== 2010 census ===
As of the 2010 census, there were 19,355 people, 6,619 households, and 5,241 families residing in the city. The population density was 1,434.8 inhabitants per square mile (554.0/km^{2}). There were 7,072 housing units at an average density of 524.2 per square mile (202.4/km^{2}). The racial makeup of the city was 87.4% White, 1.0% African American, 0.6% Native American, 6.0% Asian, 0.2% Pacific Islander, 1.2% from other races, and 3.6% from two or more races. Hispanic or Latino of any race were 4.1% of the population.

There were 6,619 households, of which 46.5% had children under the age of 18 living with them, 65.7% were married couples living together, 8.9% had a female householder with no husband present, 4.6% had a male householder with no wife present, and 20.8% were non-families. 16.2% of all households were made up of individuals, and 4.9% had someone living alone who was 65 years of age or older. The average household size was 2.91 and the average family size was 3.27.

The median age in the city was 36.9 years. 31.1% of residents were under the age of 18; 6.5% were between the ages of 18 and 24; 27.1% were from 25 to 44; 26.8% were from 45 to 64; and 8.7% were 65 years of age or older. The gender makeup of the city was 49.6% male and 50.4% female.

=== 2000 census ===
As of the 2000 census, there were 12,534 people, 4,480 households, and 3,422 families residing in the city. The population density was 1,149.3 inhabitants per square mile (443.7/km^{2}). There were 4,736 housing units at an average density of 434.3 per square mile (167.7/km^{2}). The racial makeup of the city was 92.01% White, 0.69% African American, 0.69% Native American, 3.41% Asian, 0.14% Pacific Islander, 0.80% from other races, and 2.26% from two or more races. Hispanic or Latino of any race were 2.86% of the population. 18.8% were of German, 11.3% English, 9.6% American, 8.2% Irish and 5.6% Norwegian ancestry.

There were 4,480 households, out of which 42.6% had children under the age of 18 living with them, 63.9% were married couples living together, 8.5% had a female householder with no husband present, and 23.6% were non-families. 18.6% of all households were made up of individuals, and 6.5% had someone living alone who was 65 years of age or older. The average household size was 2.78 and the average family size was 3.19.

In the city, the age distribution of the population shows 31.2% under the age of 18, 6.2% from 18 to 24, 32.5% from 25 to 44, 21.4% from 45 to 64, and 8.7% who were 65 years of age or older. The median age was 34 years. For every 100 females, there were 96.2 males. For every 100 females age 18 and over, there were 94.6 males.

The median income for a household in the city was $60,187, and the median income for a family was $64,885. Males had a median income of $51,470 versus $31,985 for females. The per capita income for the city was $27,267. About 4.4% of families and 5.4% of the population were below the poverty line, including 6.4% of those under age 18 and 4.7% of those age 65 or over.

== Education ==
The vast majority of Camas is in the Camas School District. Small parts of the city limits are in Evergreen Public Schools.

== Sister cities ==
Camas has the following sister cities, according to the Lieutenant Governor's Office:

- Hamamatsu, Japan
- Taki, Mie, Japan
- Krapkowice, Poland
- Morawica, Poland
- Zabierzów, Poland

== Notable people ==
- Michael R. Barratt, NASA astronaut
- Jaime Herrera Beutler, U.S. Representative
- Greg Biffle, NASCAR driver
- Shane Chen, inventor and entrepreneur
- Jack Colletto, professional football fullback
- Asia Consent, drag queen
- Katelynne Cox, singer and model
- Niko De Vera, professional soccer player for the Portland Timbers
- Alexa Efraimson, professional runner for Nike
- Kenneth Fisher, Forbes columnist, financial author, money manager
- Joey Gibson, right-wing political activist
- Denis Hayes, environmental activist, coordinated first Earth Day
- Maddie Kemp, professional soccer player
- Daniel Nguyen, politician and member of the Oregon House of Representatives
- Jimmie Rodgers, 1950s pop singer
- Taylor Williams, Major League Baseball player for the San Diego Padres
- Wendy Wilson, singer, member of 1990s girl group Wilson Phillips

== Gallery ==
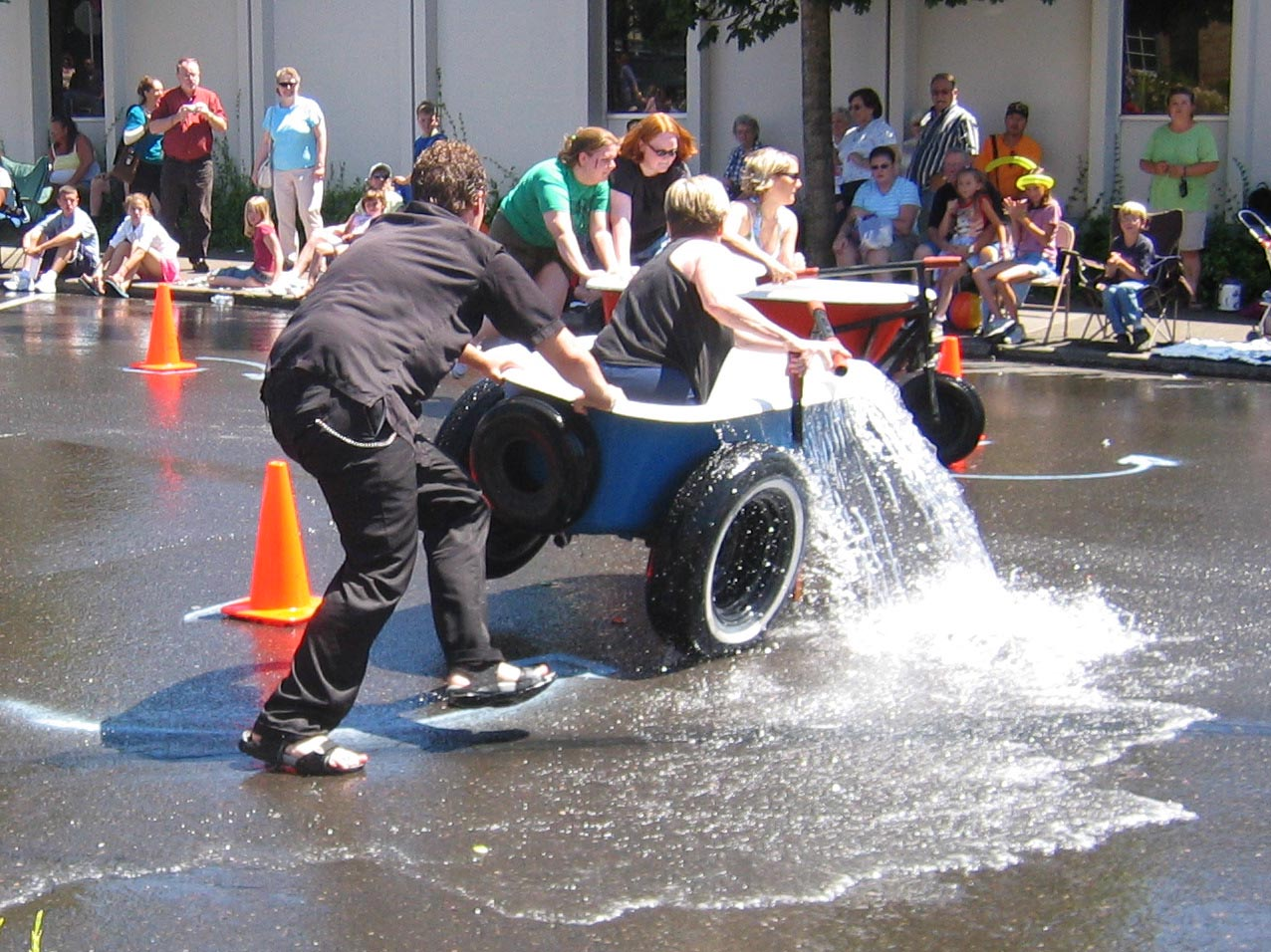
Camas Days bathtub races

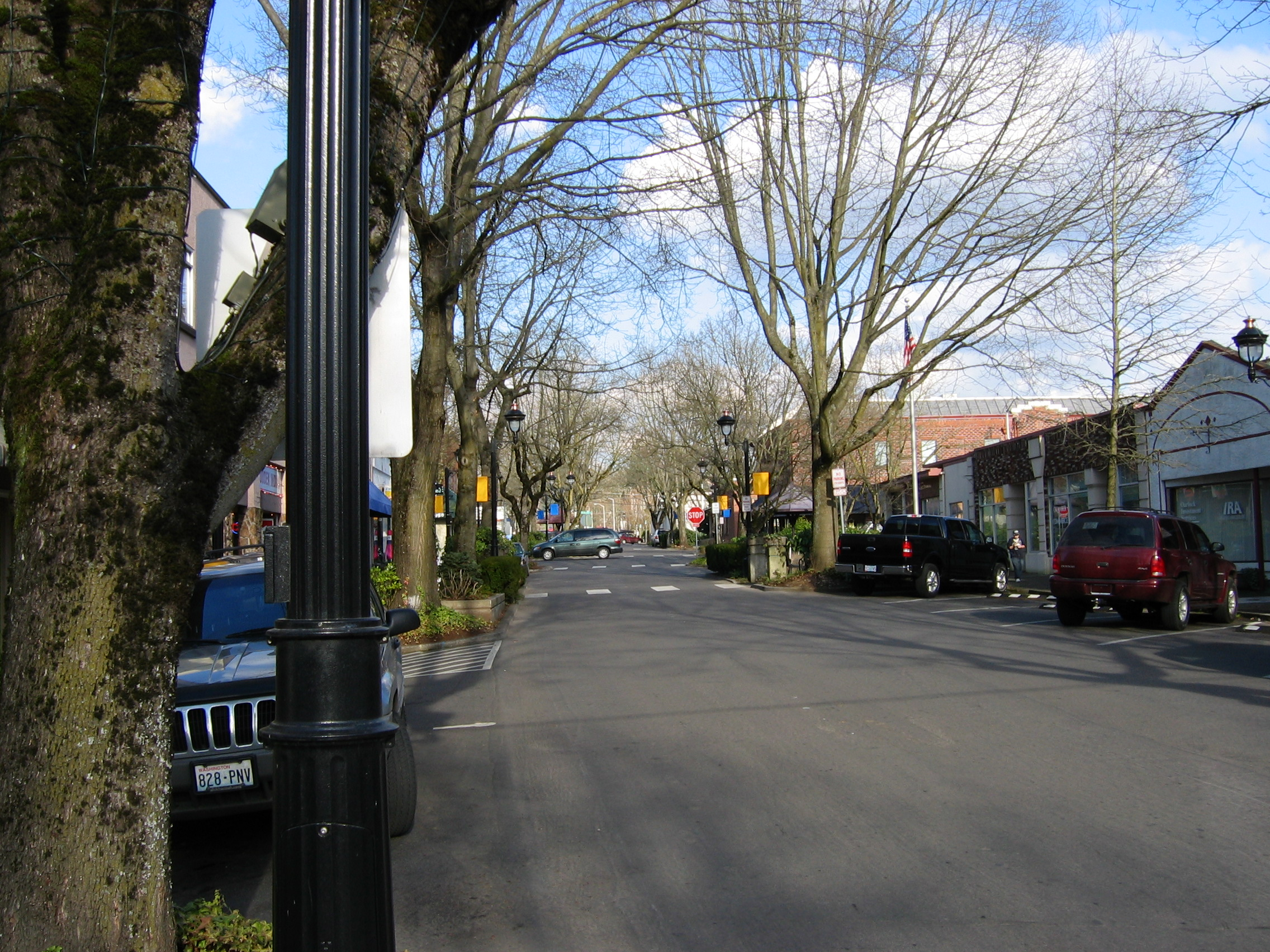
Downtown Camas, looking east

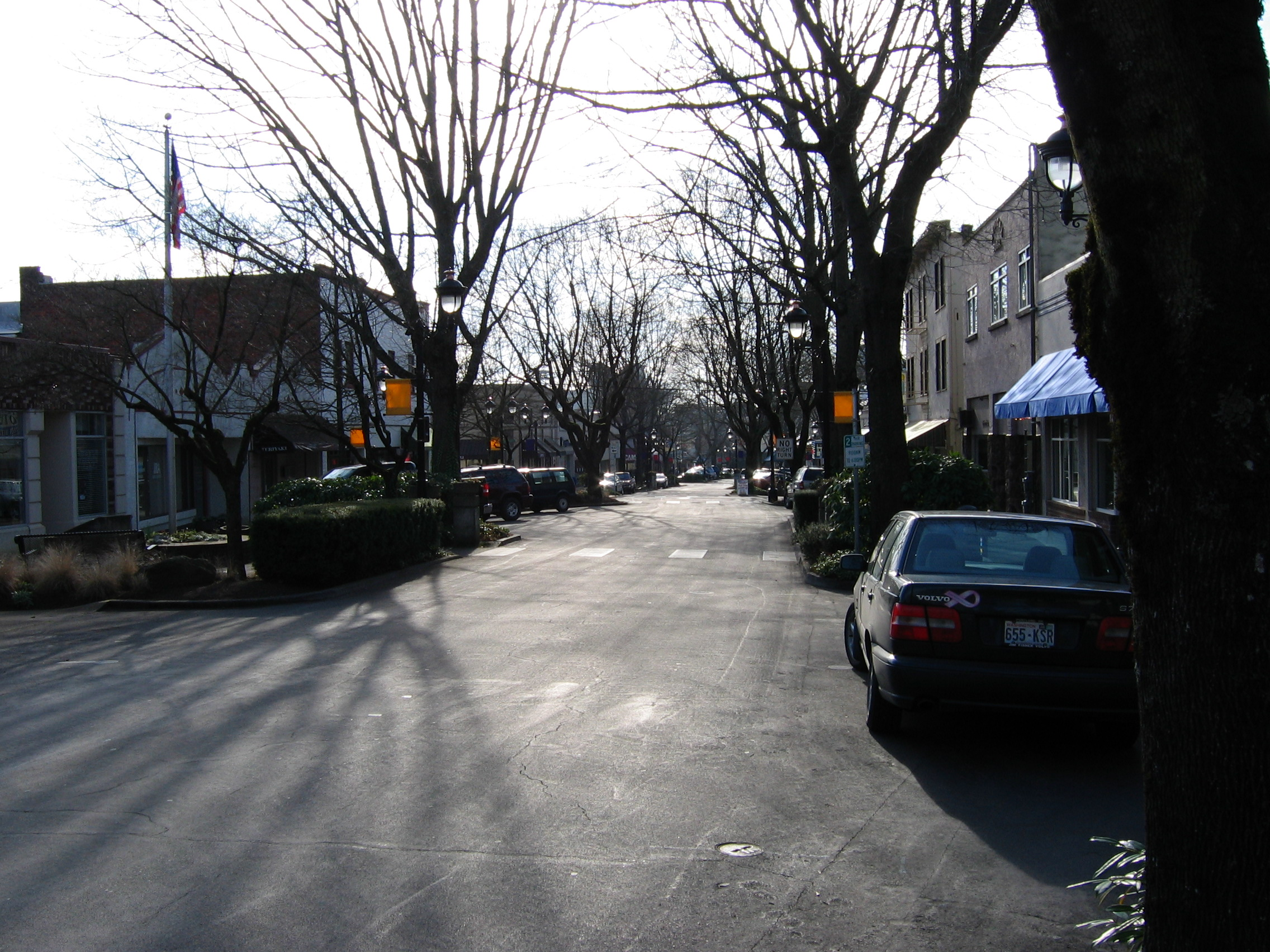
Downtown Camas, looking west

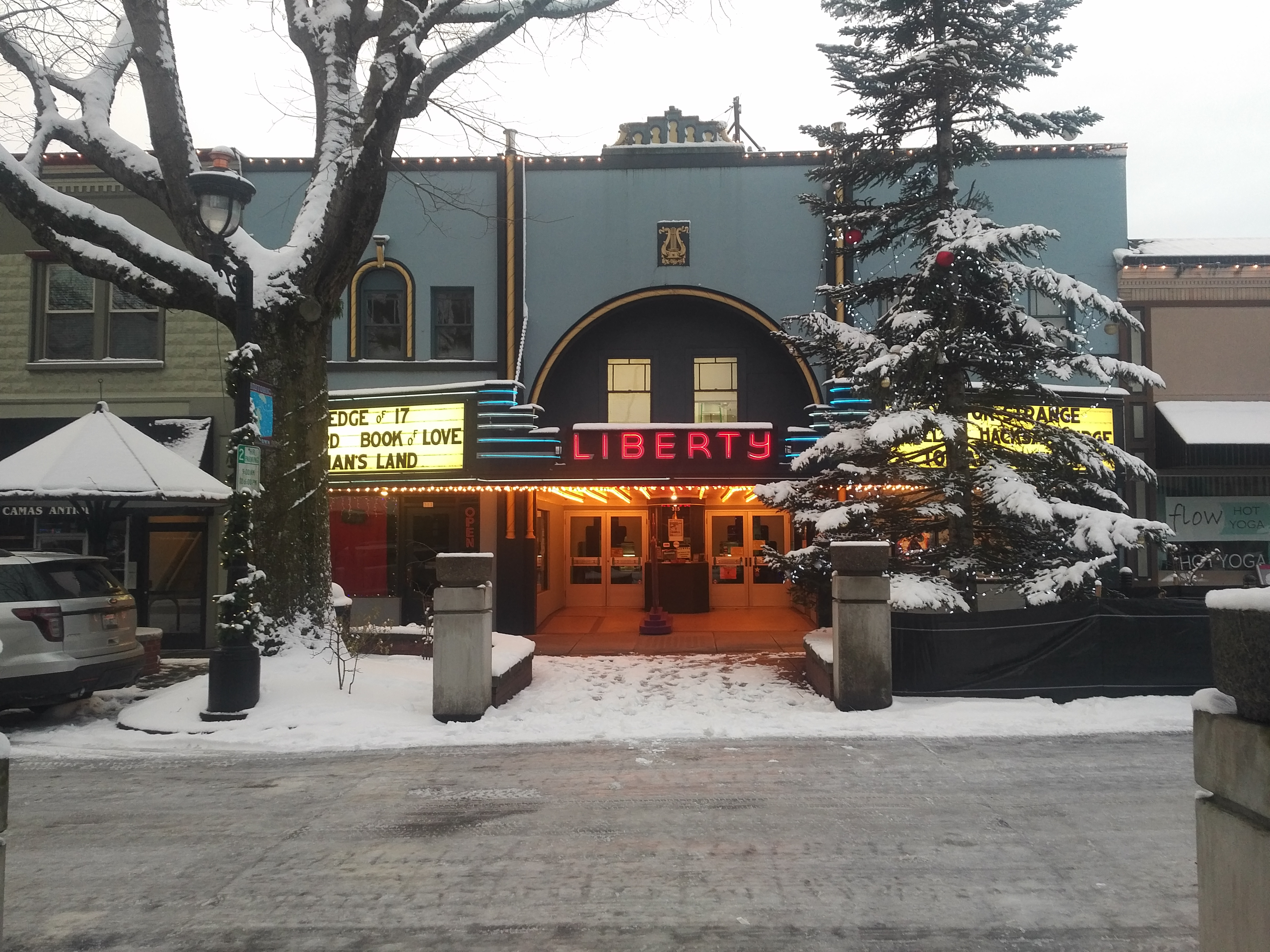
Liberty Theatre in downtown Camas

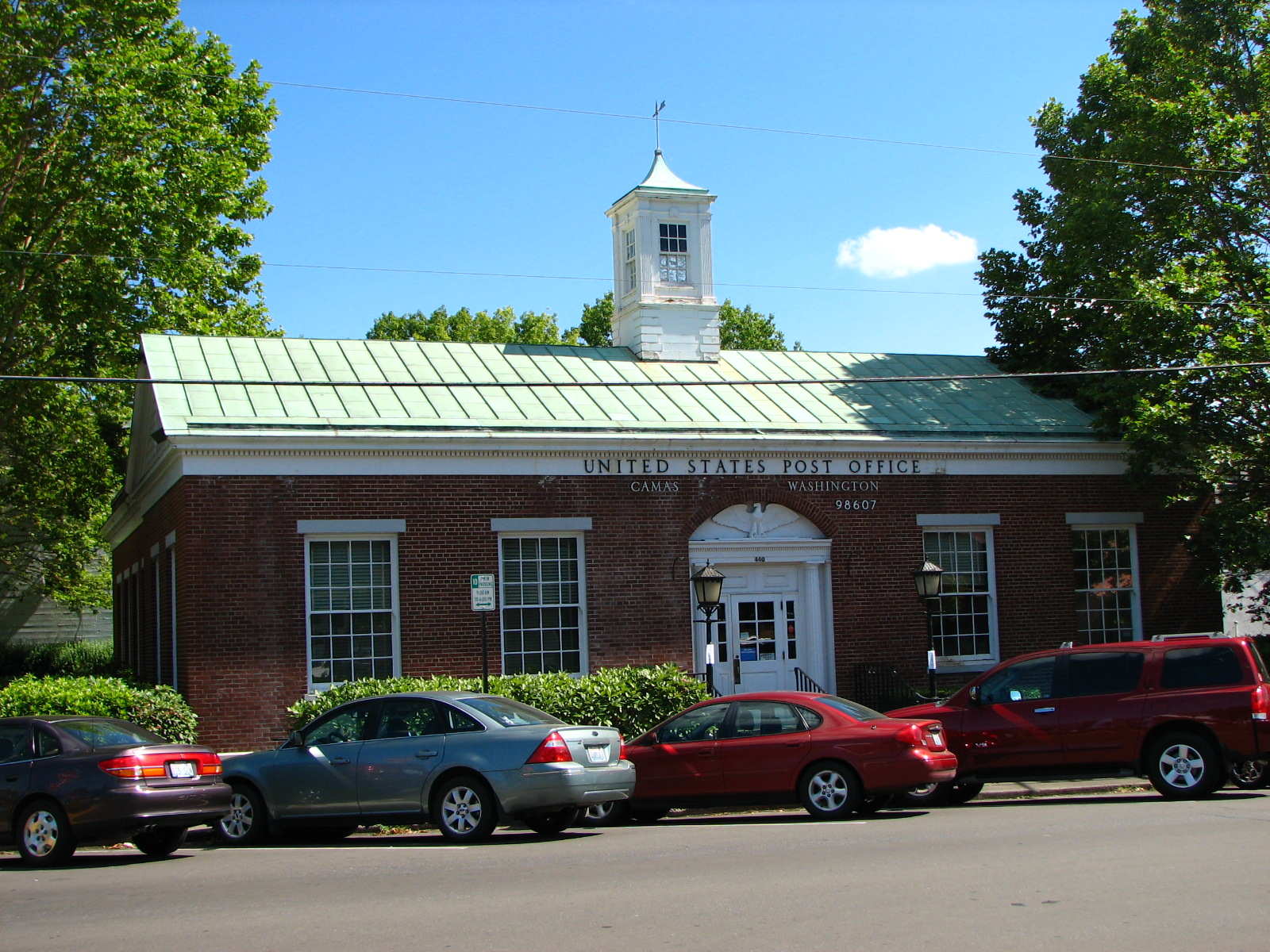
U.S. Post Office in Camas

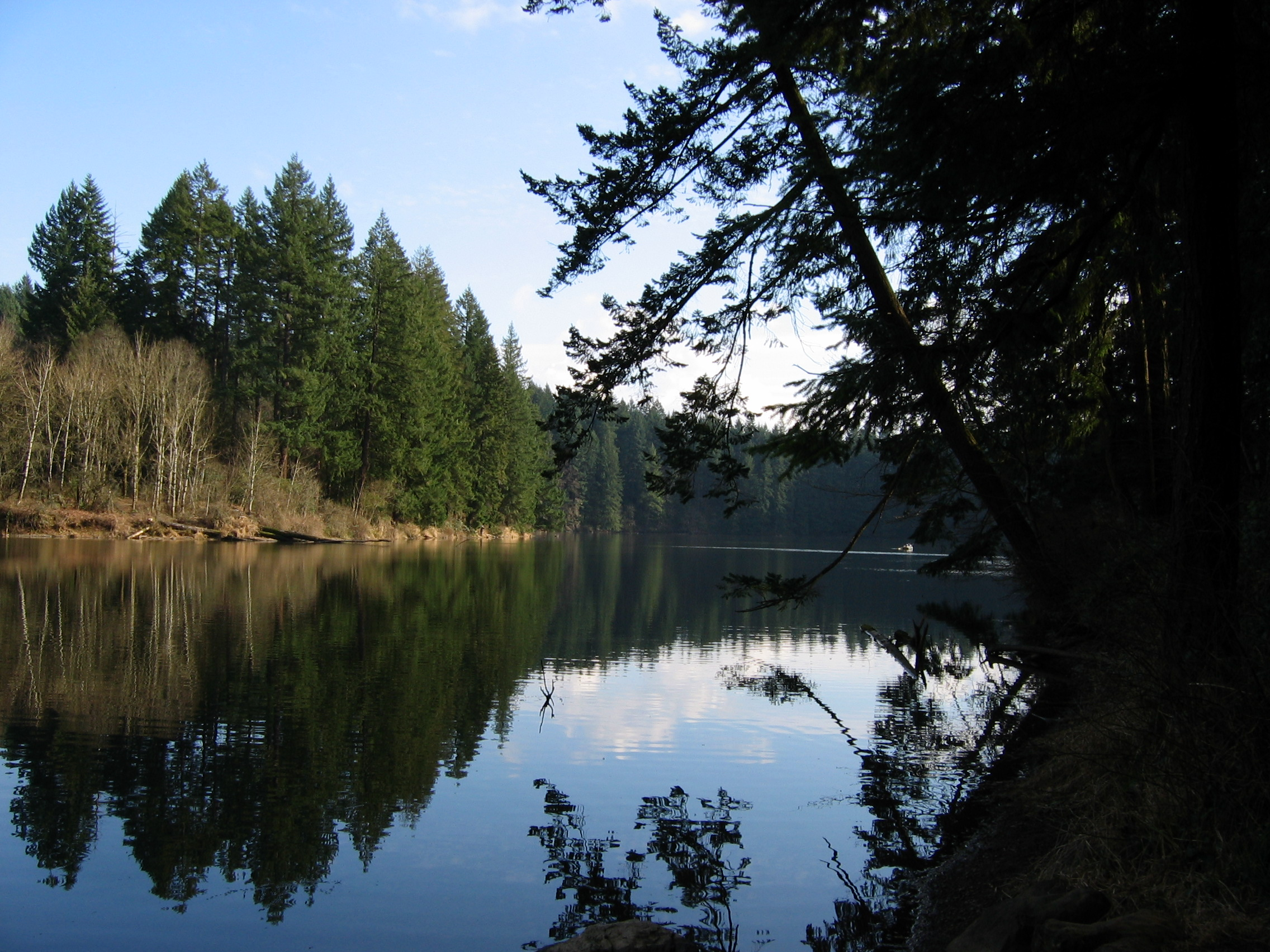
Round Lake

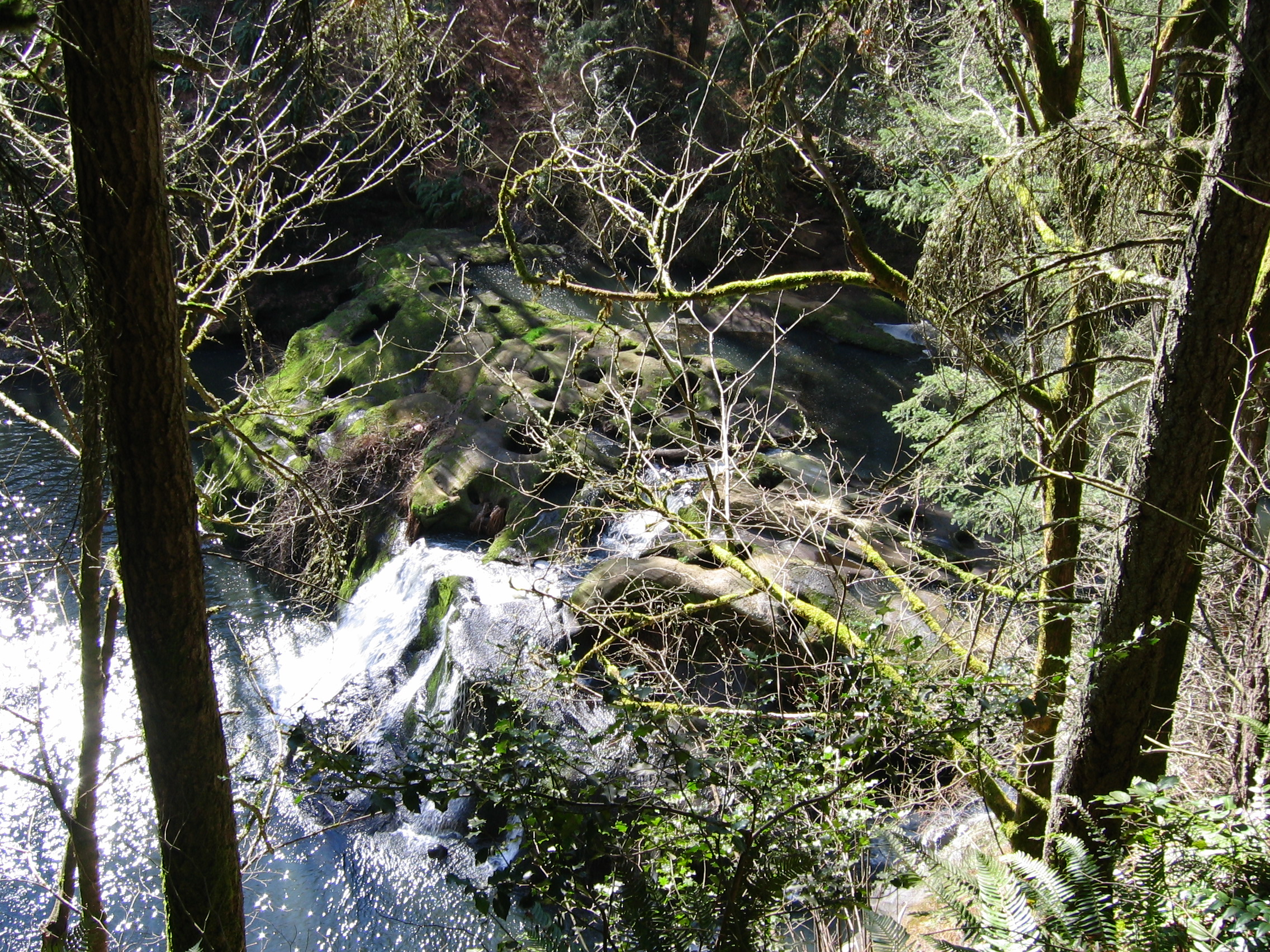
Camas Potholes

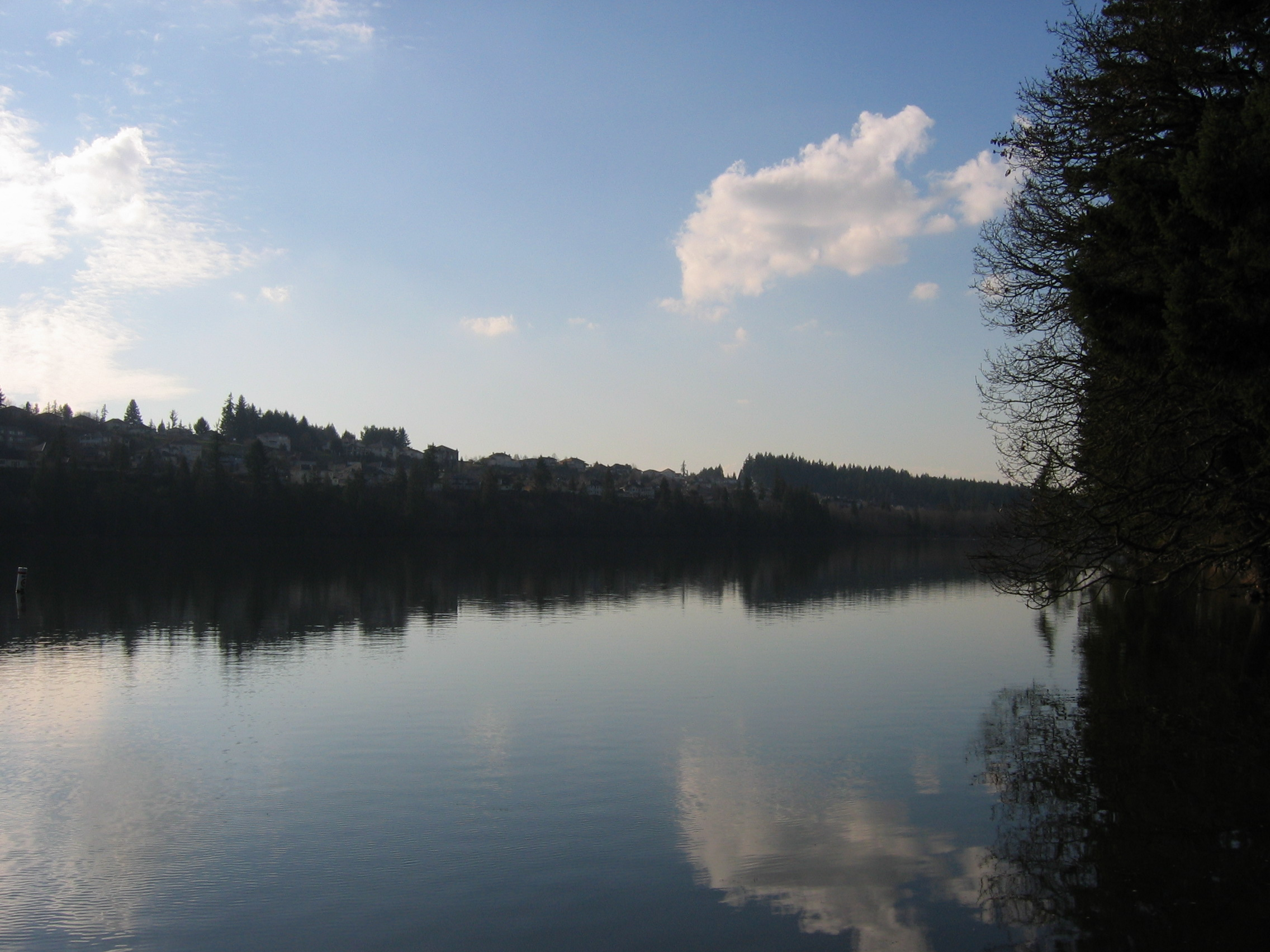
Lacamas Lake
