= Pittock =

Pittock may refer to:

- Pittock Block, a building in downtown Portland, Oregon, U.S.
- Pittock Dam, a dam in Woodstock, Ontario, Canada
- Pittock House, a house in Camas, Washington, U.S.
- Pittock Mansion, a French Renaissance-style "château" in Portland, Oregon, U.S.
- Markle-Pittock House, a house in southwest Portland, Oregon, U.S.

== People with the surname ==
- Amelia Pittock (born 1983), professional Australian squash player
- Georgiana Burton Pittock (1845–1918), pioneer and community leader in Portland, Oregon, U.S.
- Gordon Pittock (1909–1983), Canadian politician
- Henry Pittock (1835–1919), American pioneer, newspaper editor, publisher, and wood and paper magnate
- Murray Pittock (born 1962), Scottish historian

== See also ==
- Pidcock (disambiguation)
- Pitcock (disambiguation)
