= Farrell House =

Farrell House may refer to:

- Farrell House (Los Feliz, Los Angeles, California), a work by architect Lloyd Wright
- Farrell Houses, in Little Rock Arkansas
  - Farrell House (2121 Louisiana, Little Rock, Arkansas), listed on the National Register of Historic Places (NRHP)
  - Farrell House (2115 Louisiana, Little Rock, Arkansas), NRHP-listed
  - Farrell House (2111 Louisiana, Little Rock, Arkansas), NRHP-listed
  - Farrell House (2109 Louisiana, Little Rock, Arkansas), NRHP-listed

== See also ==
- Farrell Block, Hastings, Nebraska, NRHP-listed
- Farrell Building, Camas, Washington, NRHP-listed
- Templar-Farrell Motor Sales Building, Cleveland, Ohio, NRHP-listed
