= Academy Building =

Academy Building may refer to:

- Academy Building (Fall River, Massachusetts), listed on the National Register of Historic Places (NRHP)
- Academy Building (St. George, Utah), NRHP-listed
- Academy Building (University of Southern Maine), Gorham, Maine, NRHP-listed
- House of Providence (Vancouver, Washington), commonly known as the Academy Building; NRHP-listed
