= National Register of Historic Places listings in Clark County, Washington =

Location of Clark County in Washington

This list presents the full set of buildings, structures, objects, sites, or districts designated on the National Register of Historic Places in Clark County, Washington, and offers brief descriptive information about each of them. The National Register recognizes places of national, state, or local historic significance across the United States. Out of over 90,000 National Register sites nationwide, Washington is home to approximately 1,500, and 45 of those are found partially or wholly in Clark County.

This National Park Service list is complete through NPS recent listings posted June 6, 2026.

== Current listings ==
	Name on the Register	Image	Date listed	Location	City or town	Description
1	Amboy United Brethren Church	Amboy United Brethren Church	December 4, 2008 (#08001184)	21416 NE 399th Street; 45°54′37″N 122°27′12″W	Amboy	
2	Anderson–Beletski Prune Farm	Anderson–Beletski Prune Farm	May 15, 1986 (#86001100)	13220 Northwest 42nd Court; 45°43′01″N 122°42′51″W	Vancouver	Farm was subdivided and most properties demolished or developed. Only the farm house is still standing in its original location.
3	Arndt Prune Dryer	Arndt Prune Dryer	October 4, 1979 (#79002527)	2109 Northwest 219th Street; 45°46′43″N 122°41′37″W	Ridgefield	
4	Basalt Cobblestone Quarries District	Basalt Cobblestone Quarries District	December 14, 1981 (#81000587)	Roughly bounded by Gee Creek, Lake River and BNSF Railway, about 2 miles (3.2 km) northwest of Ridgefield, in Ridgefield National Wildlife Refuge; 45°50′25″N 122°45′45″W	Ridgefield	The 535 acres (217 ha) area comprises 7 basalt quarries.
5	Cedar Creek Grist Mill	Cedar Creek Grist Mill	March 26, 1975 (#75001844)	43907 Northeast Grist Mill Road; 45°56′18″N 122°35′00″W	Woodland	
6	Chumasero–Smith House	Chumasero–Smith House	April 7, 1998 (#98000282)	310 West 11th Street; 45°37′47″N 122°40′28″W	Vancouver	
7	Clark County Courthouse	Clark County Courthouse	April 11, 2014 (#14000165)	1200 Franklin Street; 45°37′49″N 122°40′40″W	Vancouver	
8	Clark County Poor Farm – Southwestern Washington Experiment Station	Clark County Poor Farm – Southwestern Washington Experiment Station	January 7, 2013 (#12001159)	1919 Northeast 78th Street; 45°40′42″N 122°39′06″W	Vancouver	Actually hosting the Washington State University Extension of Clark County.
9	Covington House	Covington House	May 5, 1972 (#72001268)	4201 Main Street; 45°39′09″N 122°39′59″W	Vancouver	
10	Elks Building	Elks Building	July 14, 1983 (#83003322)	916 Main Street; 45°37′43″N 122°40′19″W	Vancouver	
11	Evergreen Hotel	Evergreen Hotel	January 1, 1979 (#79002529)	500 Main Street; 45°37′31″N 122°40′19″W	Vancouver	
12	Farrell Building	Farrell Building	March 15, 2006 (#06000135)	305 Northeast 4th Avenue; 45°35′08″N 122°24′18″W	Camas	
13	Fort Vancouver National Historic Site	Fort Vancouver National Historic Site	October 15, 1966 (#66000370)	Roughly bounded by Lewis and Clark Highway, Interstate 5, East Evergreen Boulevard and East Reserve Street; 45°37′27″N 122°39′40″W	Vancouver	
14	Glenwood School	Glenwood School	June 11, 1992 (#92000697)	13305 Northeast 87th Avenue; 45°43′06″N 122°35′00″W	Glenwood	Included in the Rural Public Schools of Washington State MPS.
15	Albert and Letha Green House and Barn	Albert and Letha Green House and Barn	February 19, 1982 (#82004202)	25716 NE Lewisville Highway; 45°48′33″N 122°32′53″W	Battle Ground vicinity	
16	Henry Heisen House	Henry Heisen House	October 4, 1979 (#79002526)	27904 NE 174th Avenue; 45°49′29″N 122°29′38″W	Heisson	
17	Hidden Houses	Hidden Houses	November 29, 1978 (#78002737)	100 and 110 W. 13th Street; 45°37′53″N 122°40′16″W	Vancouver	
18	House of Providence	House of Providence	December 1, 1978 (#78002738)	400 E. Evergreen Boulevard; 45°37′47″N 122°40′01″W	Vancouver	
19	John P. and Mary Kiggins House	John P. and Mary Kiggins House	June 30, 1995 (#95000804)	411 E. Evergreen Boulevard; 45°37′47″N 122°40′01″W	Vancouver	
20	Kiggins Theater	Kiggins Theater	July 17, 2012 (#12000421)	1011 Main Street; 45°37′45″N 122°40′17″W	Vancouver	part of the Movie Theaters in Washington State Multiple Property Submission
21	Lambert School	Lambert School	March 16, 1989 (#89000216)	21814 NW 11th Avenue; 45°46′47″N 122°40′55″W	Ridgefield	Rural Public Schools of Washington State MPS
22	Judge Columbia Lancaster House	Judge Columbia Lancaster House	February 20, 1975 (#75001843)	North of Ridgefield on Lancaster Road; 45°51′48″N 122°44′52″W	Ridgefield	
23	Lewisville Park	Lewisville Park	May 28, 1986 (#86001202)	26411 NE Lewisville Highway; 45°49′02″N 122°32′23″W	Battle Ground	
24	Luepke Florist	Luepke Florist	May 17, 2016 (#16000293)	1300 Washington Street; 45°37′52″N 122°40′23″W	Vancouver	
25	Heye H. and Eva Meyer Farmstead	Heye H. and Eva Meyer Farmstead	January 7, 2015 (#14001142)	13705 NE 50th Avenue; 45°43′17″N 122°37′11″W	Vancouver	
26	Northrop Primary School	Northrop Primary School	December 13, 2022 (#100008454)	611 Grand Blvd. 45°37′29″N 122°38′26″W	Vancouver	
27	Officers Row, Fort Vancouver Barracks	Officers Row, Fort Vancouver Barracks	November 11, 1974 (#74001948)	611–1616 E. Evergreen Boulevard; 45°37′41″N 122°39′30″W	Vancouver	
28	Parkersville Site	Parkersville Site	August 11, 1976 (#76001880)	24 S A St. 45°34′46″N 122°22′55″W	Washougal	
29	Pittock House	Pittock House	July 3, 1979 (#79003148)	114 NE Leadbetter Road; 45°37′21″N 122°25′42″W	Camas	
30	Pomeroy Farm	Pomeroy Farm	March 13, 1987 (#87000413)	20902 NE Lucia Falls Road; 45°50′27″N 122°27′30″W	Yacolt	
31	John Roffler House	John Roffler House	April 29, 1993 (#93000368)	1437 NE Everett Street; 45°35′27″N 122°24′16″W	Camas	
32	Sara Store	Sara Store	March 30, 1995 (#95000304)	17903 NW 41st Avenue; 45°45′02″N 122°42′46″W	Ridgefield	
33	William Henry Shobert House	William Henry Shobert House	October 4, 1979 (#79002528)	621 Shobert Lane; 45°48′40″N 122°44′26″W	Ridgefield	
34	Slocum House	Slocum House	January 18, 1973 (#73001867)	605 Esther Street; 45°38′07″N 122°40′27″W	Vancouver	
35	John Stanger House	John Stanger House	May 17, 1990 (#90000785)	9213 SE Evergreen Highway; 45°36′24″N 122°34′42″W	Vancouver	
36	U.S. National Bank Building	U.S. National Bank Building	December 29, 1988 (#84004010)	601 Main Street; 45°37′34″N 122°40′13″W	Vancouver	
37	U.S. Post Office – Camas Main	U.S. Post Office – Camas Main	August 7, 1991 (#91000639)	440 NE 5th Avenue; 45°35′12″N 122°24′18″W	Camas	
38	U.S. Post Office – Vancouver Main	U.S. Post Office – Vancouver Main	May 30, 1991 (#91000659)	1211 Daniels Street; 45°37′51″N 122°40′24″W	Vancouver	
39	Vancouver National Historic Reserve Historic District	Vancouver National Historic Reserve Historic District	January 5, 2007 (#06001216)	Roughly bounded by an alley north of Officers Row, East Reserve Street, Columbia River, and Interstate 5; 45°37′35″N 122°39′19″W	Vancouver	
40	Vancouver Public Library	Vancouver Public Library	August 3, 1982 (#82004204)	1511 Main Street; 45°38′00″N 122°40′12″W	Vancouver	Carnegie Libraries of Washington TR
41	Vancouver Telephone Building	Vancouver Telephone Building	November 6, 1986 (#86003092)	112 W. 11th Street; 45°37′48″N 122°40′16″W	Vancouver	
42	Vancouver–Portland Bridge	Vancouver–Portland Bridge	July 16, 1982 (#82004205)	Spanning the Columbia River on Interstate 5 northbound 45°37′04″N 122°40′30″W	Vancouver	Historic Bridges and Tunnels in Washington TR
43	Venersborg School	Venersborg School	March 16, 1989 (#89000215)	Junction of NE 209th Street and NE 242nd Avenue; 45°46′23″N 122°25′25″W	Battle Ground vicinity	Rural Public Schools of Washington State MPS
44	Washington School for the Blind	Washington School for the Blind	May 14, 1993 (#93000370)	2214 E. 13th Street; 45°38′24″N 122°38′46″W	Vancouver	
45	Yale Bridge	Yale Bridge	July 16, 1982 (#82004206)	Spanning the Lewis River on State Route 503 (see also Cowlitz County); 45°57′40″N 122°22′18″W	Yale	Historic Bridges and Tunnels in Washington TR

== Former listings ==
	Name on the Register	Image	Date listed	Date removed	Location	City or town	Description
1	Ridgefield American Women's League Chapter House		June 2, 1982 (#82004203)	July 16, 1990	406 N. 1st Street	Yale	

== See also ==
- National Register of Historic Places listings in Washington state
- Listings in neighboring counties: Columbia, Cowlitz, Multnomah, Skamania
- Historic preservation
- History of Washington (state)
- Index of Washington (state)-related articles
