= John Stanger House =

Historic house in Washington, United States

- U.S. National Register of Historic Places
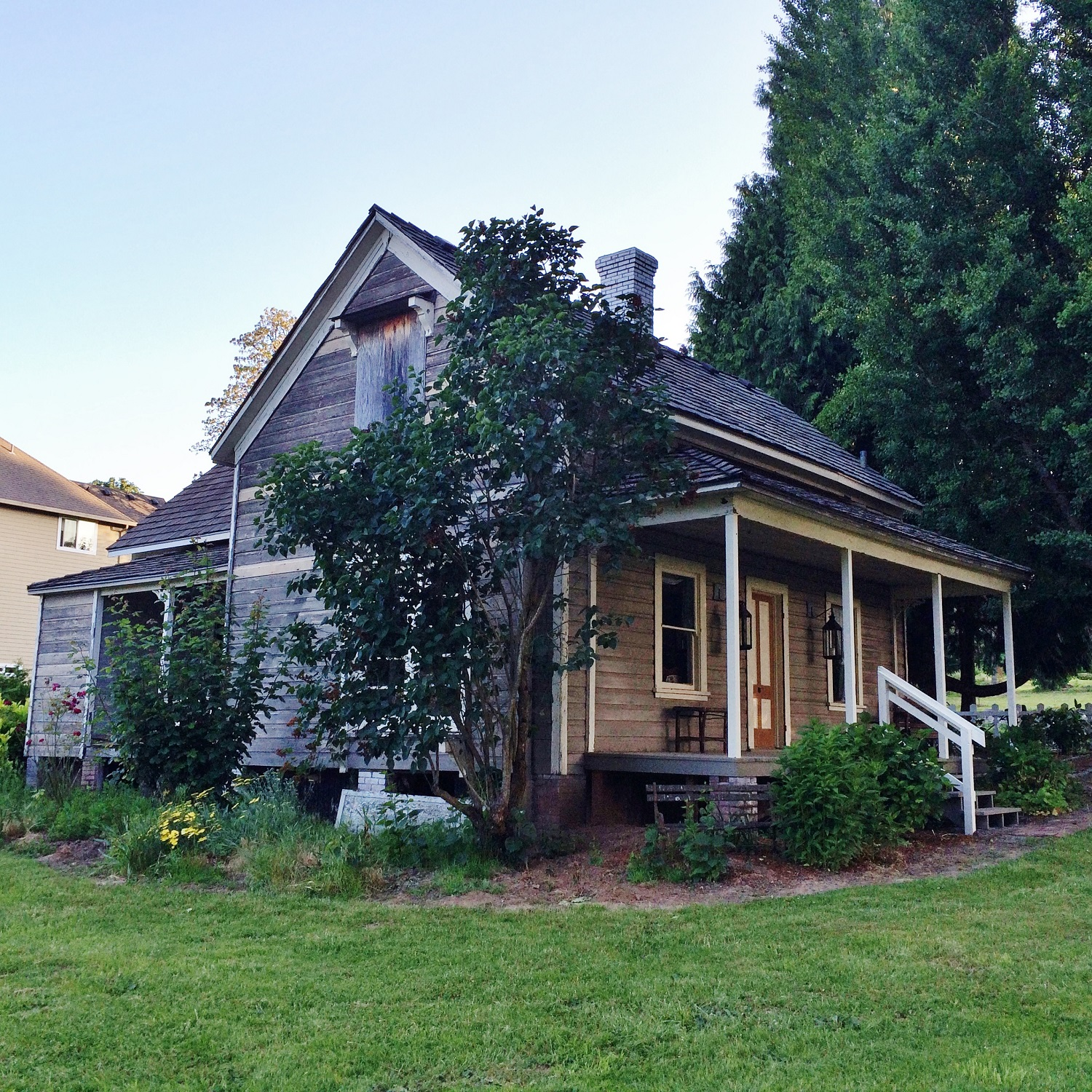
- The house's exterior, 2015

- Location within Washington (state)
- Nearest city: Vancouver, Washington
- Coordinates: 45°36′24″N 122°34′42″W
- Area: 4 acres (1.6 ha)
- Architect: Stanger, John
- Architectural style: Mid 19th Century Revival
- NRHP reference No.: 90000785
- Added to NRHP: May 17, 1990

The John Stanger House is a house located in Vancouver, Washington in the Jane Weber Evergreen Arboretum and is listed on the National Register of Historic Places. It is considered the oldest private home in Clark county still on its original site and the second oldest residence in the county.

The home's site was settled circa 1840 by John Stranger, a millwright for the Hudson's Bay Company who came to the area in 1838 and later assisted in the construction of a water-powered gristmill in nearby Mill Creek for Fort Vancouver.

== See also ==
- National Register of Historic Places listings in Clark County, Washington
