= Liberty Theatre (Camas, Washington) =

Movie theater in Washington state, U.S.

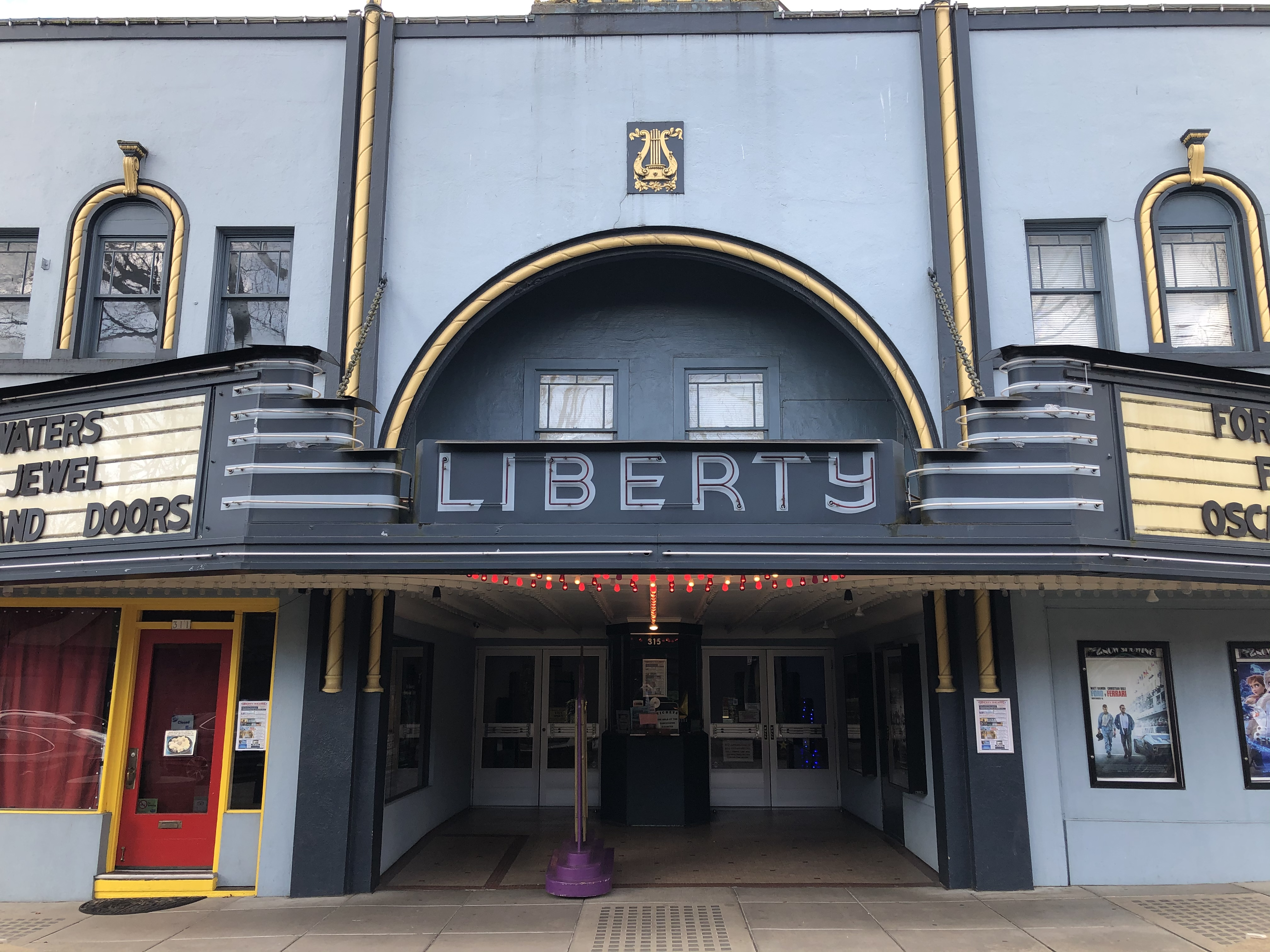
- Interactive map of the Liberty Theatre area
- Former names: Granada Theatre

General information
- Location: 315 Northeast Fourth Ave, Camas, Washington, United States
- Current tenants: The Rootstock Capital Management LLC
- Year built: 1927
- Opened: June 14, 1927
- Renovated: 1994-1996, 2011

Design and construction
- Architecture firm: P. M. Hall-Lewis
- Other designers: Charles Anman

The Liberty Theatre, formerly known as the Granada Theatre, is a movie theater in downtown Camas, Washington. It is the only movie theater in the city and is located on NE Fourth Avenue, next door to the Farrell Building.

== History ==
The Granada Theatre was constructed in 1927 with funding from Camas businessman Charles Farrell, who also owned the land the theater was built on, along with the Community Investment Corporation, a group of local citizens. Design and construction cost about $75,000, including a $12,000 pipe organ, and lasted about six months.

Architect P. M. Hall-Lewis of Portland, Oregon designed the theater, while Charles Anman designed the interior and the entryway. It is an example of art deco style with “Spanish/Moorish” influences.

The Granada opened on June 14, 1927, showing the war comedy Lost at the Front. Admission was 30¢ for adults, 10¢ for children. In addition to movies, the theater presented live performances such as vaudeville on a stage that was 25 feet deep and 32 feet wide.

New management changed the theater's name to the Liberty in 1938.

On November 13, 1989, serial killer Westley Allan Dodd was captured and arrested after attempting to abduct a 6-year-old boy from the restroom of the theater.

On August 27, 1994, a three-alarm fire destroyed the ticket booth, lobby, and concession area, and damaged the balcony. Owners the Farrell family invested about $630,000 in a restoration project that took 20 months to complete. A firewall constructed as part of the restoration eliminated the live performance stage. The Liberty reopened on April 26, 1996, with a special showing of The American President.

The Liberty closed for financial reasons in September 2009. In 2011, Rootstock Capital Management LLC struck a deal with the theater's owners to reopen and operate the theater. On reopening, the Liberty switched from a first-run movie theater to a second-run and arthouse venue. Renovations included the creation of a second screen, dubbed The Granada as a nod to the Liberty's history. The theater reopened on March 17, 2011, with a showing of Darby O’Gill and the Little People.

In 2013, the theater converted from film to digital projection.

== Layout ==
When it was constructed, the Granada was a single-screen theater with 800 seats.

When the Liberty reopened in 2011, one of the renovations was to add a smaller second screen.

Now the Liberty's main auditorium seats about 348 people, and the Granada seats 29.

== Gallery ==
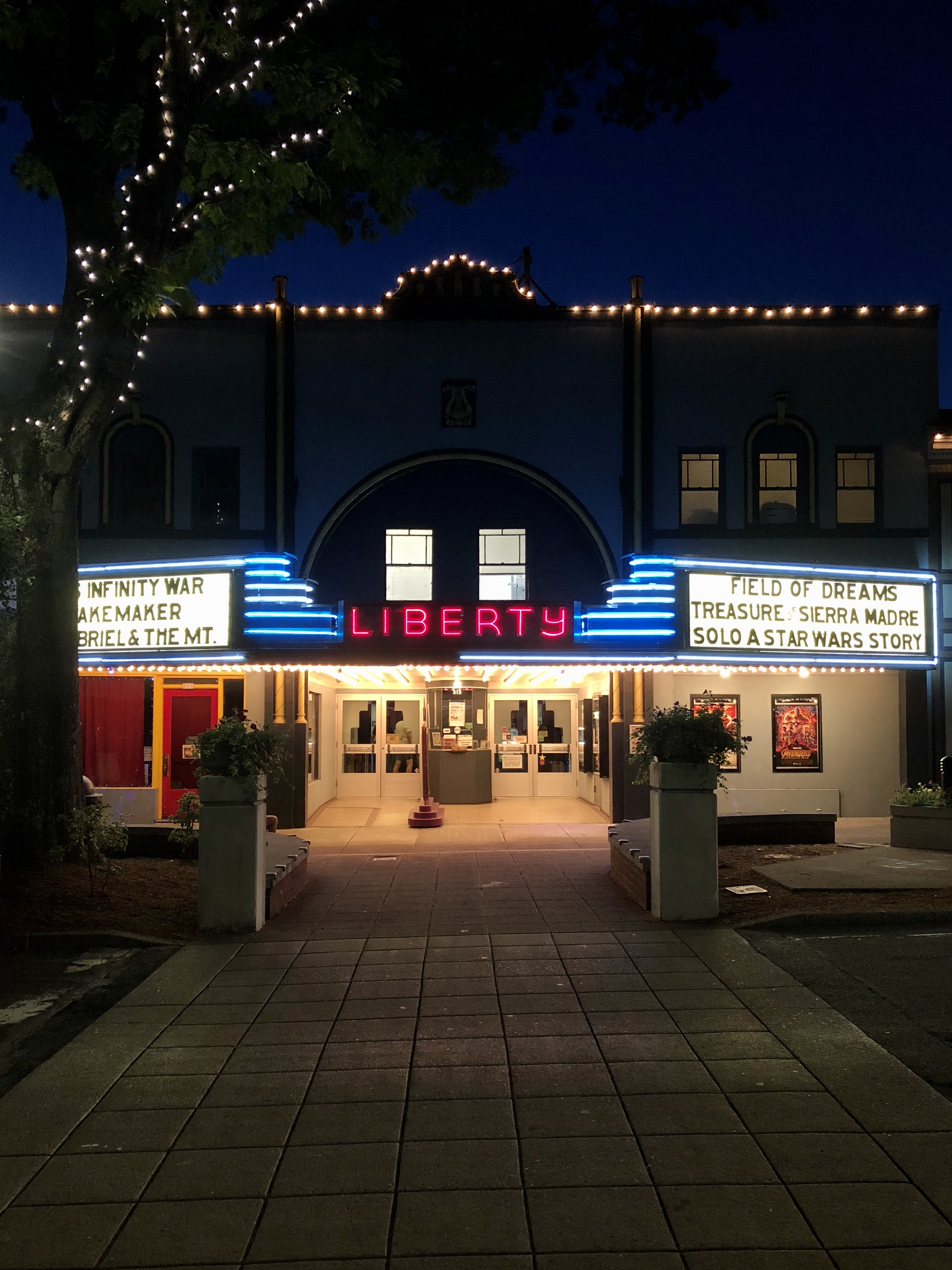
Lit up, viewed from across NE Fourth Ave

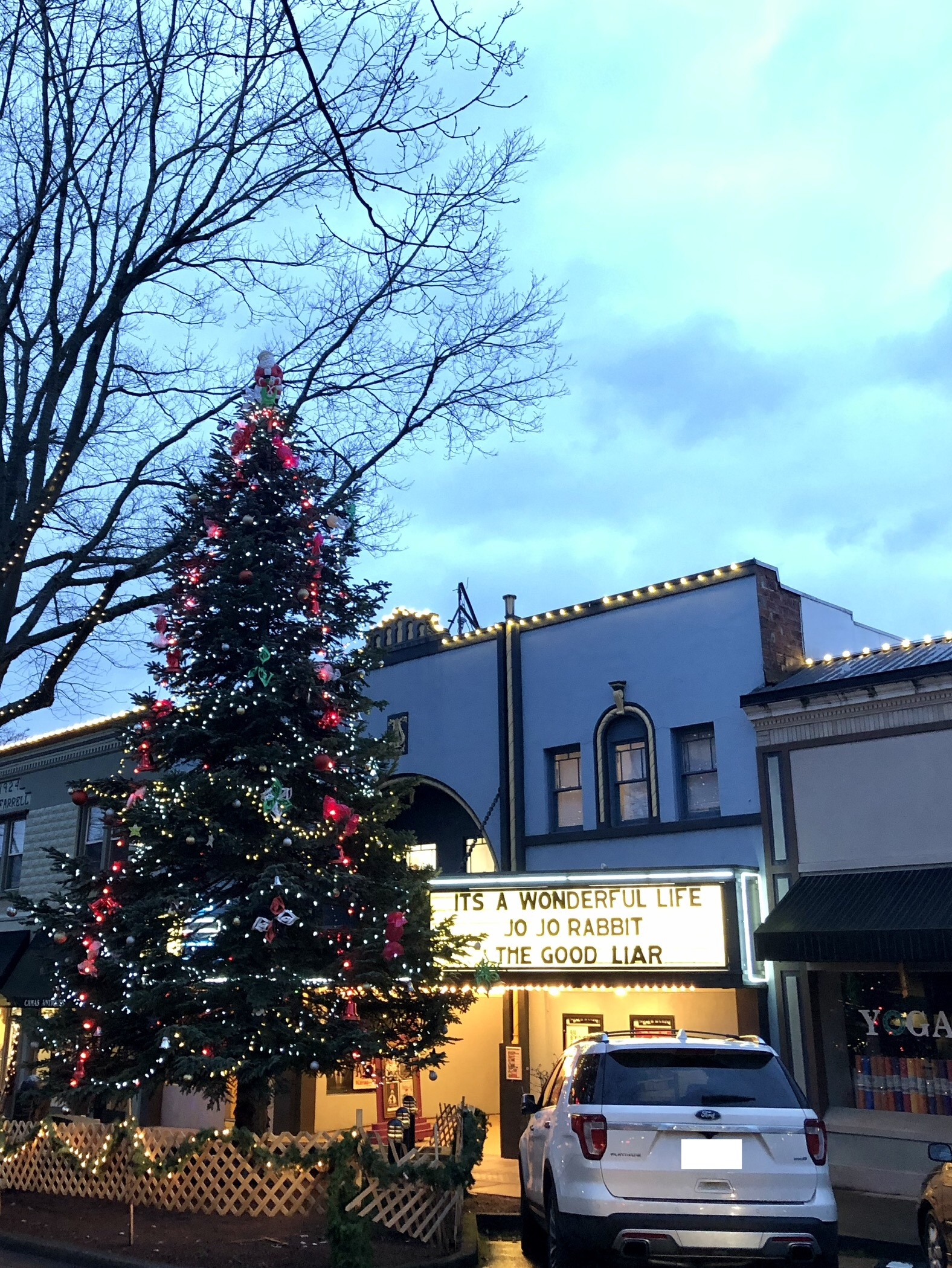
Public Christmas tree in front of the theater in December

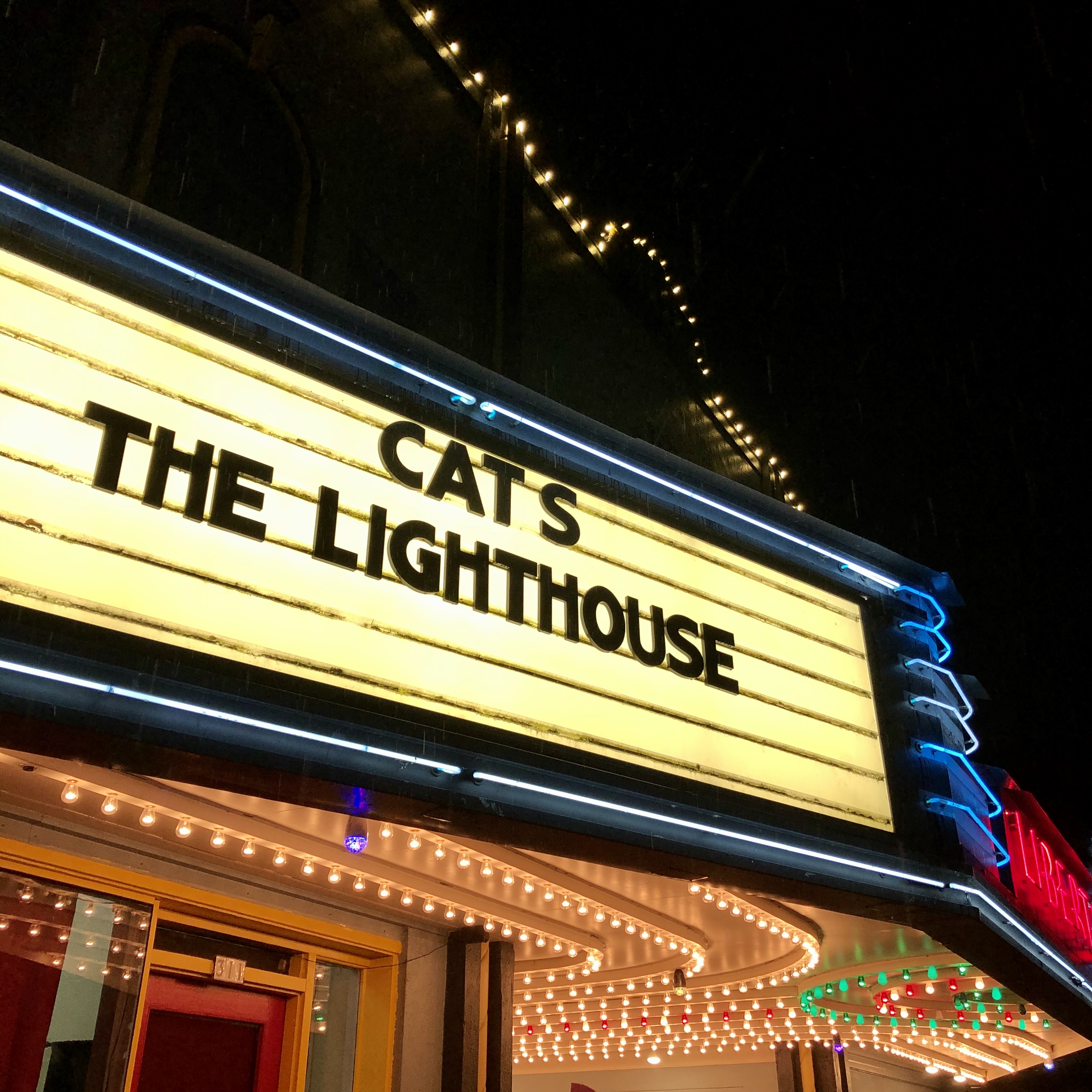
Close up of the marquee

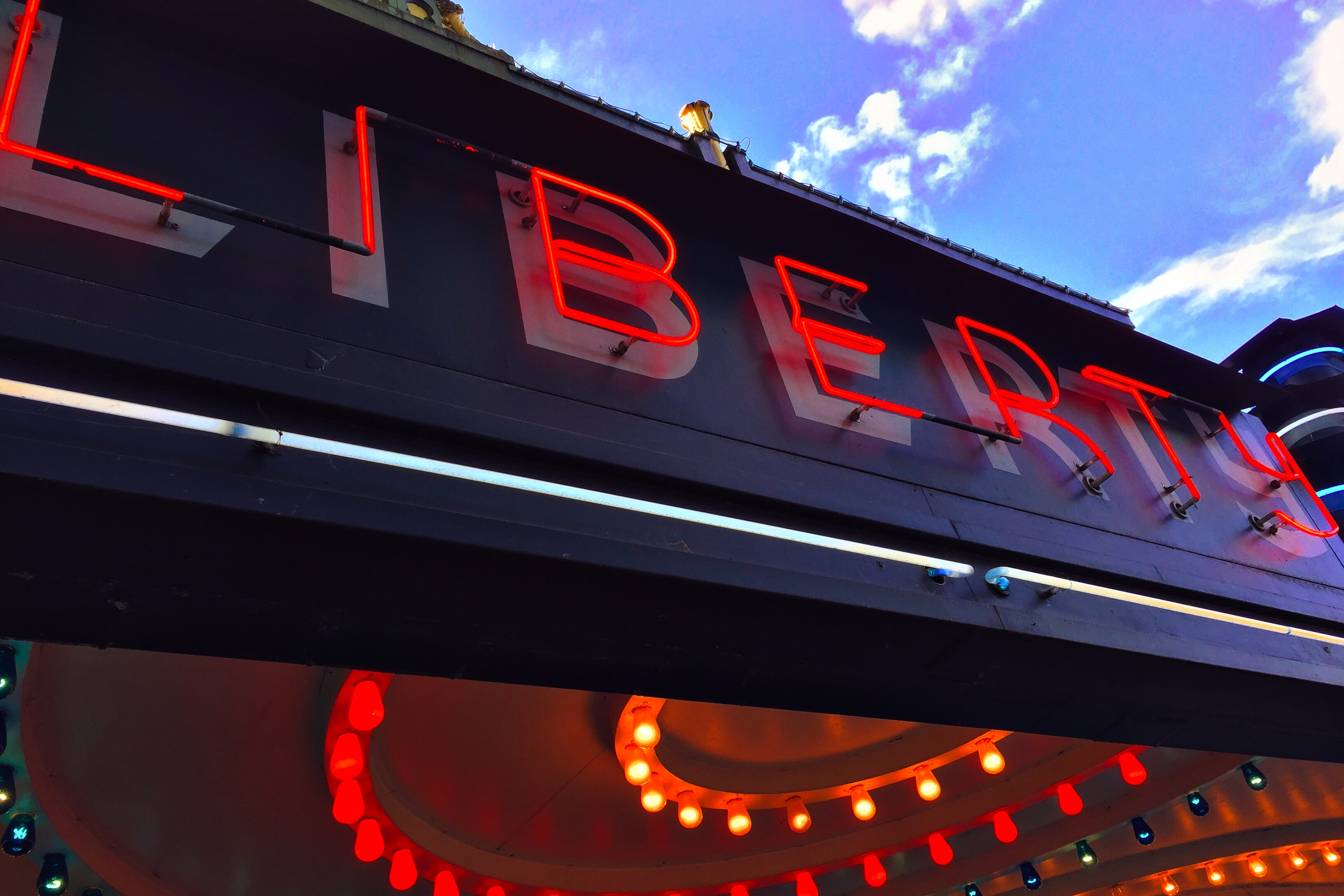
The neon "Liberty"

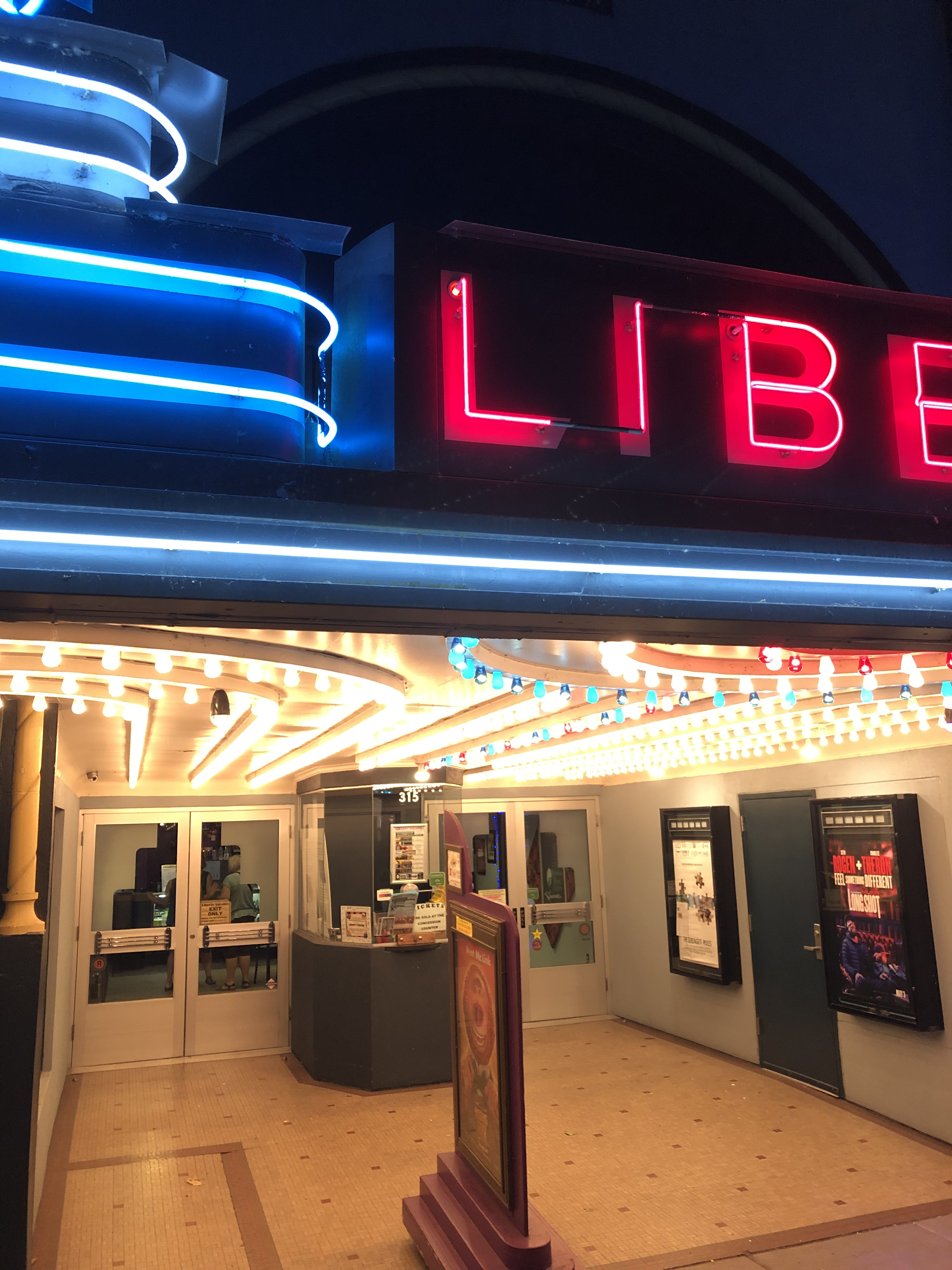
Entryway at night

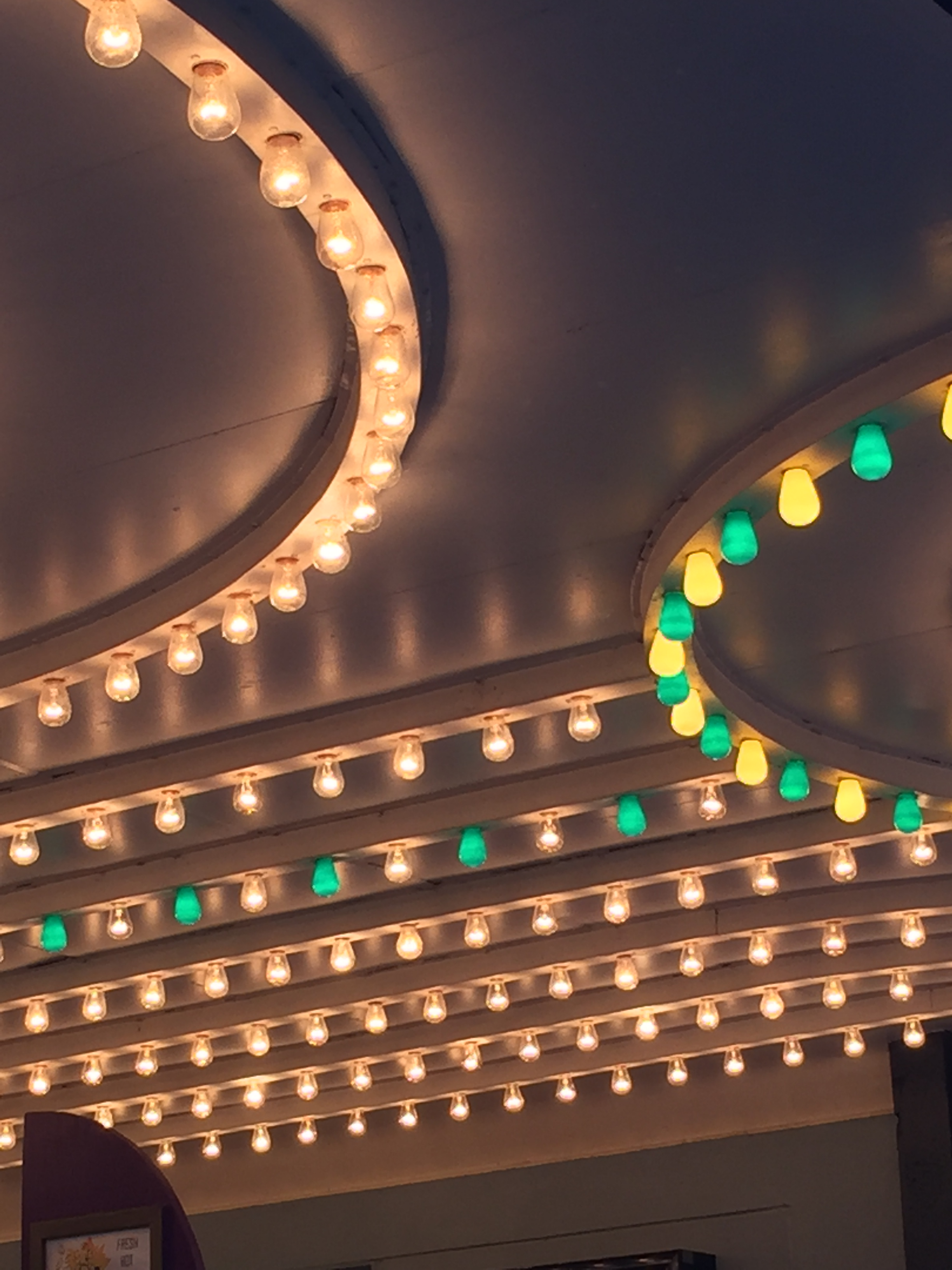
Lights above the entryway
