= John Roffler House =

Historic house in Washington, United States

- U.S. National Register of Historic Places
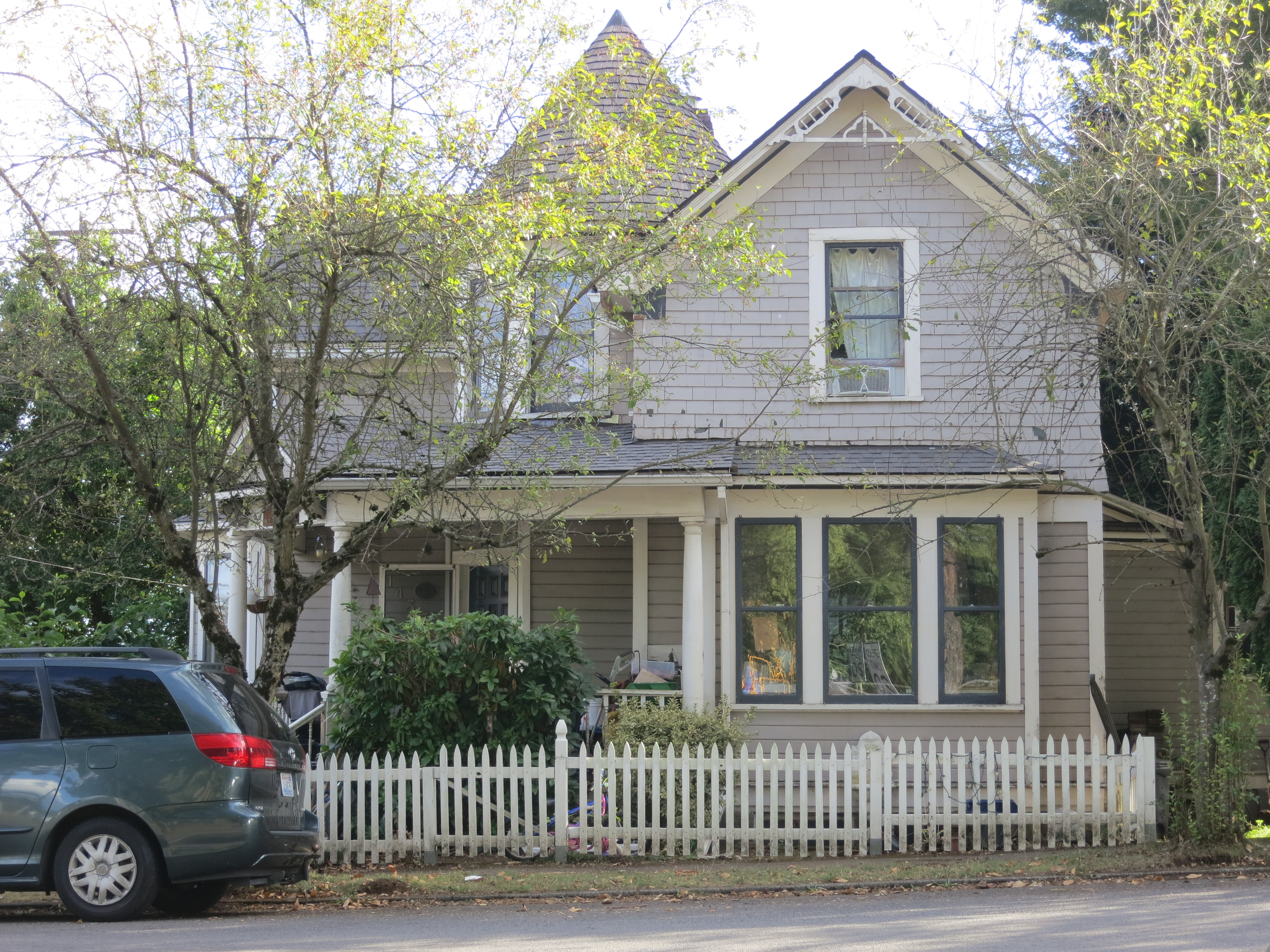
- Facade of house in 2014

- Location within Washington (state) Location within the United States
- Location: 1437 NE Everett St., Camas, Washington
- Coordinates: 45°35′27″N 122°24′16″W
- Area: less than 1 acre (0.40 ha)
- Built: c. 1906
- Architect: John Roffler
- Architectural style: Queen Anne
- NRHP reference No.: 93000368
- Added to NRHP: 29 April 1993

The John Roffler House is a historic house located at 1437 NE Everett Street in Camas, Washington.

== Description and history ==
The two story wood frame Roffler House sits on the southwest corner of NE 15th Street and Everett Street across from Crown Park in Camas' upper residential area. The floor plan is an L shape with intersecting two story wings with gabled roofs. The facade features a porch with roof sheltering the square entry bay. The foundation is concrete and wall treatments are drop siding with corner boards on the lower floor and shingles on the upper. The roof material is wood shingles added in a modern renovation. At the juncture of the wings a brick chimney extends above the roof ridge. An engaged turret rises above the entry porch roof. Large bay windows in the gable ends light the first floor, a projecting bay on the east wing has three tall one over one double hung sash. Window framing is plain wood surrounds. The north gable end has a box bay with a tripartite window arrangement covered by a pent roof.

John Roffler was the community's most prolific architect/builder. This building was constructed c. 1906 to be his family home. It was the first execution of a design by Roffler in Camas. Roffler impacted the built environment of the community more than any other individual. The property was listed on the National Register of Historic Places on April 29, 1993.

== See also ==
- National Register of Historic Places listings in Clark County, Washington
