= Hidden Houses =

Historic houses in Washington, United States

- U.S. National Register of Historic Places
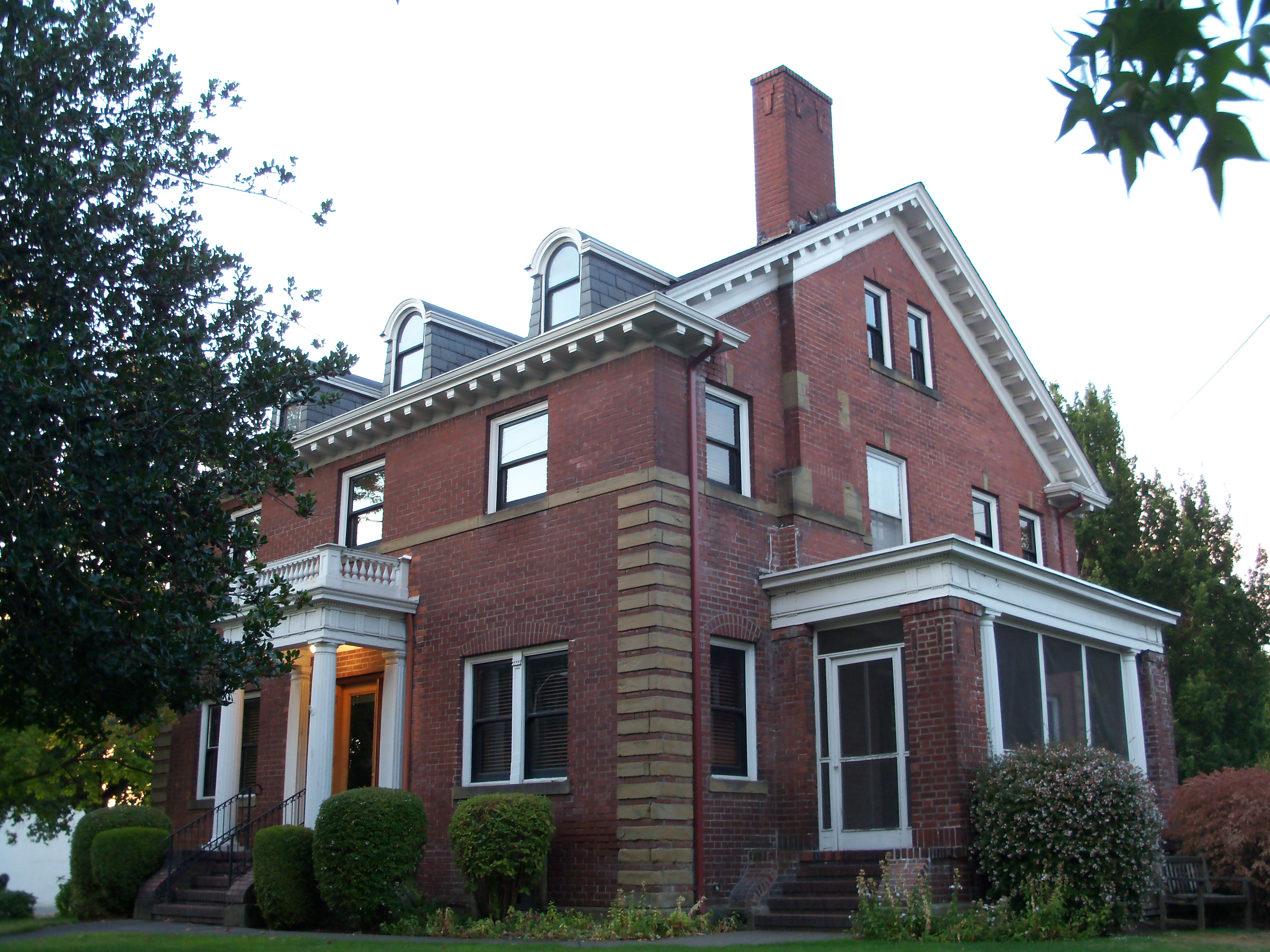
- W. Foster Hidden House

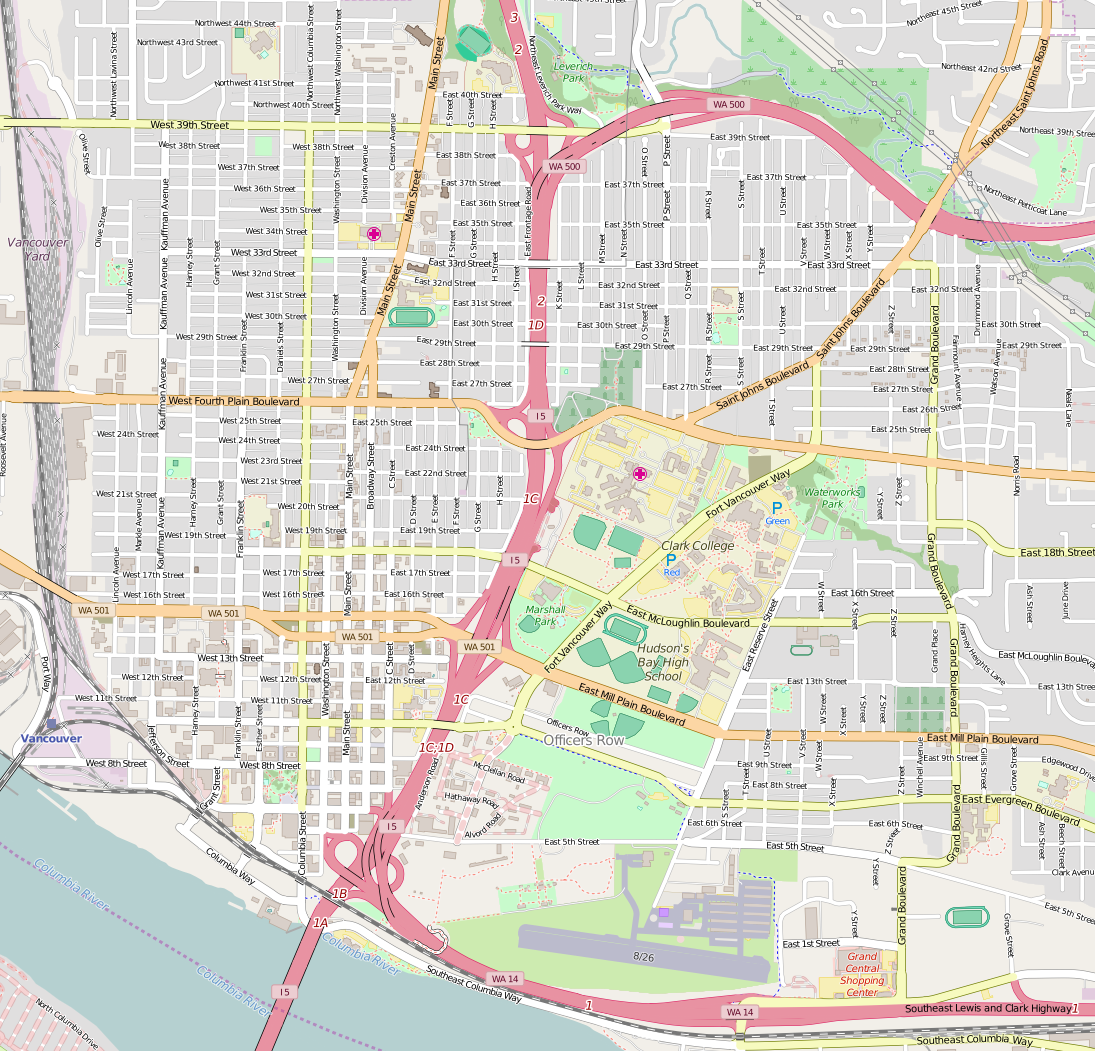
- Location within Vancouver Washington
- Location: 100 and 110 W. 13th St., Vancouver, Washington
- Coordinates: 45°37′53″N 122°40′16″W
- Area: less than one acre
- Built: 1884
- Architects: Oliver Hidden, A.E. Davis
- Architectural style: Colonial Revival, Queen Anne, Georgian Revival
- NRHP reference No.: 78002737
- Added to NRHP: November 29, 1978

The Hidden Houses are a pair of historic houses located in Vancouver, Washington. They are listed on the National Register of Historic Places.

The historic Lowell M. Hidden and W. Foster Hidden houses have helped shape the face of Vancouver, Washington. The Hidden family has been present in Vancouver since the 1860s with Lowell Mason Hidden being the first to arrive from New England in 1864.

In 1871, Lowell M. Hidden started the Hidden Brick Company. It's estimated that 60 million bricks were made there and built many of the historic buildings in downtown Vancouver including the Mother Josephs Providence Academy in 1873, and the St James Cathedral in 1885.

Lowell M. Hidden died in 1923 and his sons W. Foster and Oliver Hidden took over the brick company. The partnership ended in 1940 when Oliver Hidden died, leaving the company to W. Foster. Today, the Brick company is owned by Robert Hidden, W. Fosters son, who took over the business after W. Foster died in 1963.

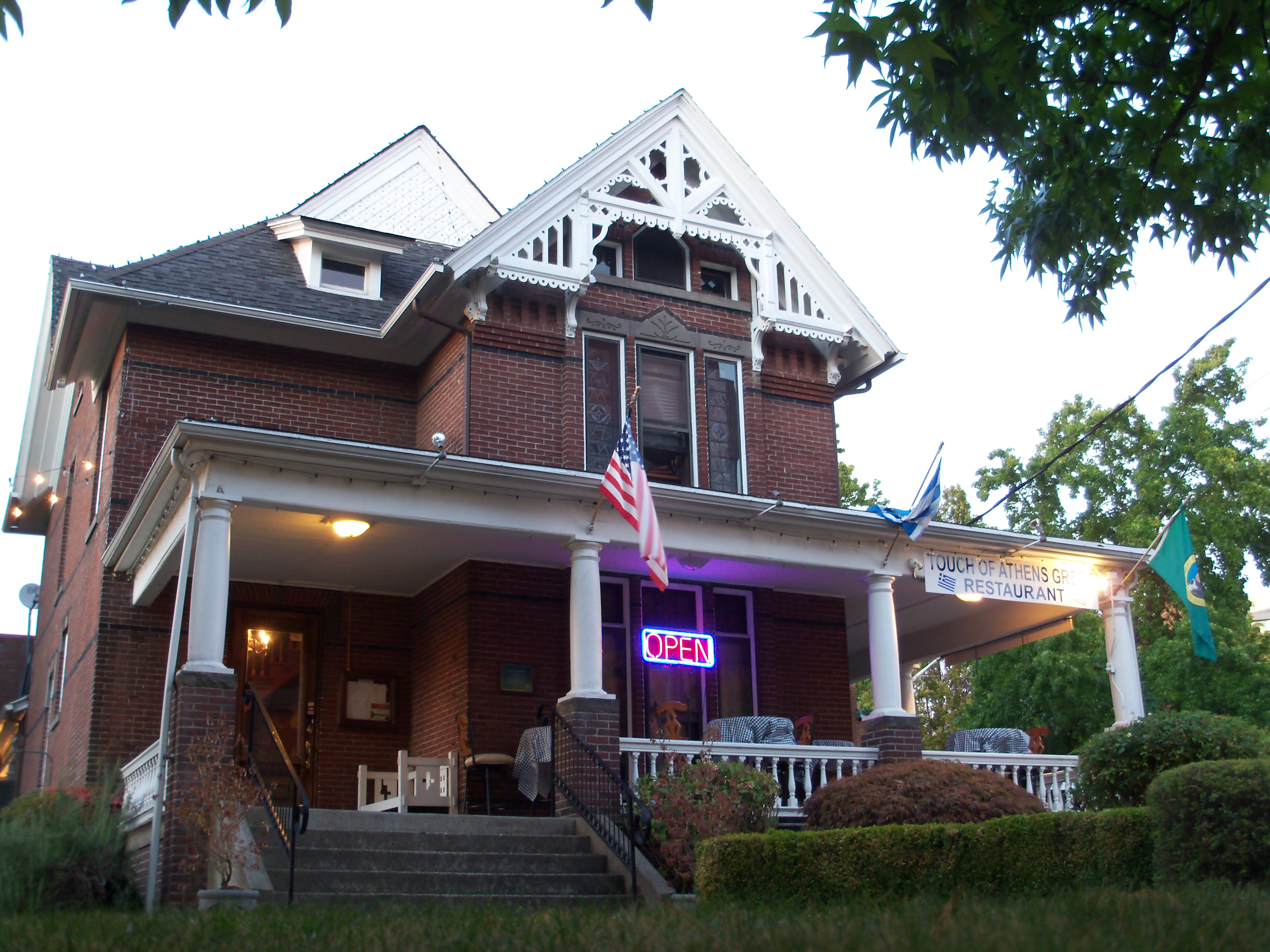
Lowell M. Hidden House

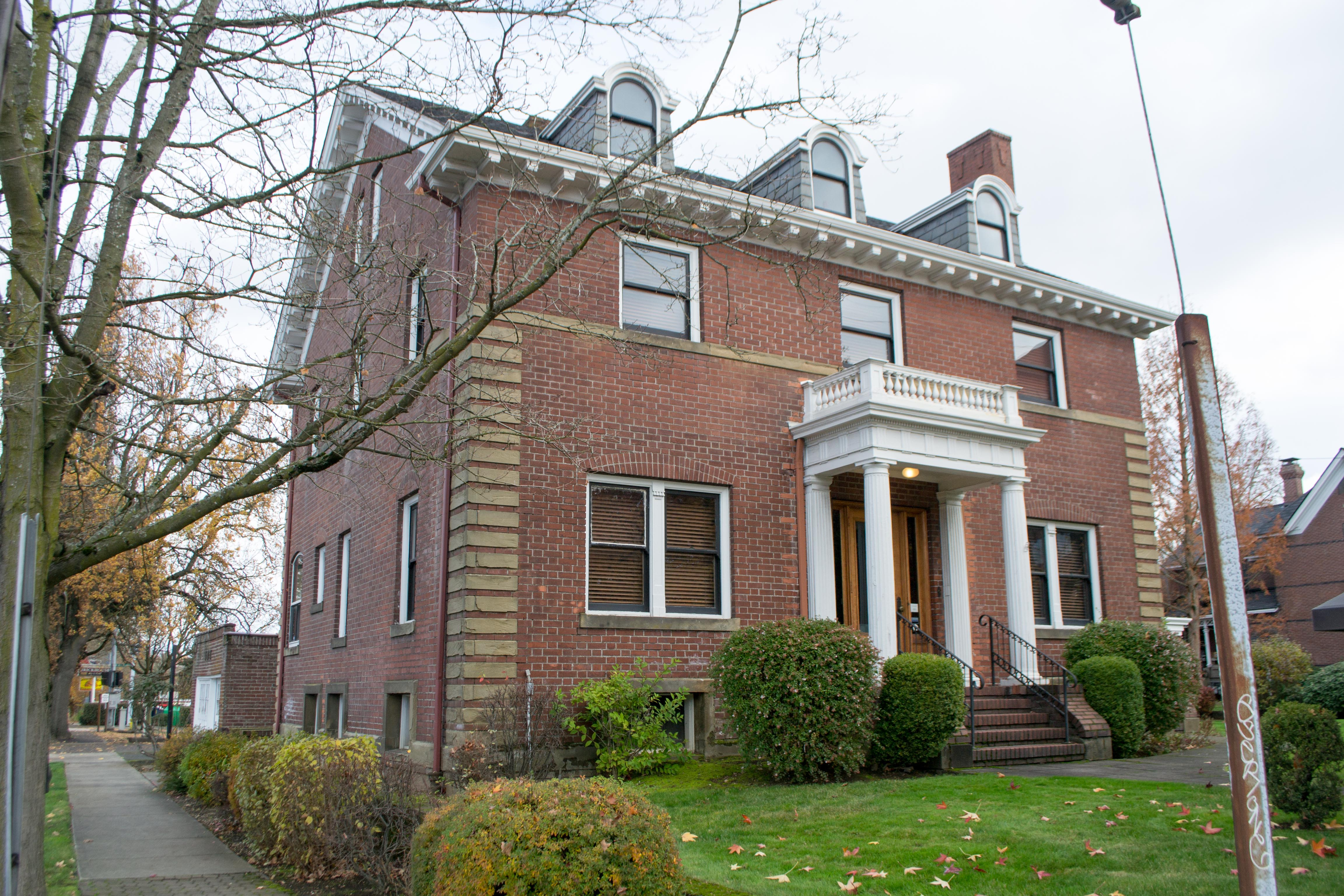
W. Foster Hidden House

== See also ==
- National Register of Historic Places listings in Clark County, Washington
