= Pitcock =

Pitcock may refer to:

- Lands of Pitcocks, Middle Ages term for an area near East Lothian; see Robert de Lawedre of Edrington

== People with the surname ==
- Bill Pitcock IV, guitarist with the Dwight Twilley Band
- Chuck Pitcock (1958–2016), American football player
- Joan Pitcock (born 1967), American professional golfer
- Josh Pitcock, American political operative
- Quinn Pitcock (born 1983), American football player

== See also ==
- Petcock, a small shut-off valve
- Pidcock (disambiguation)
- Pittock (disambiguation)
