= Albert and Letha Green House and Barn =

Historic house in Washington, United States

- U.S. National Register of Historic Places
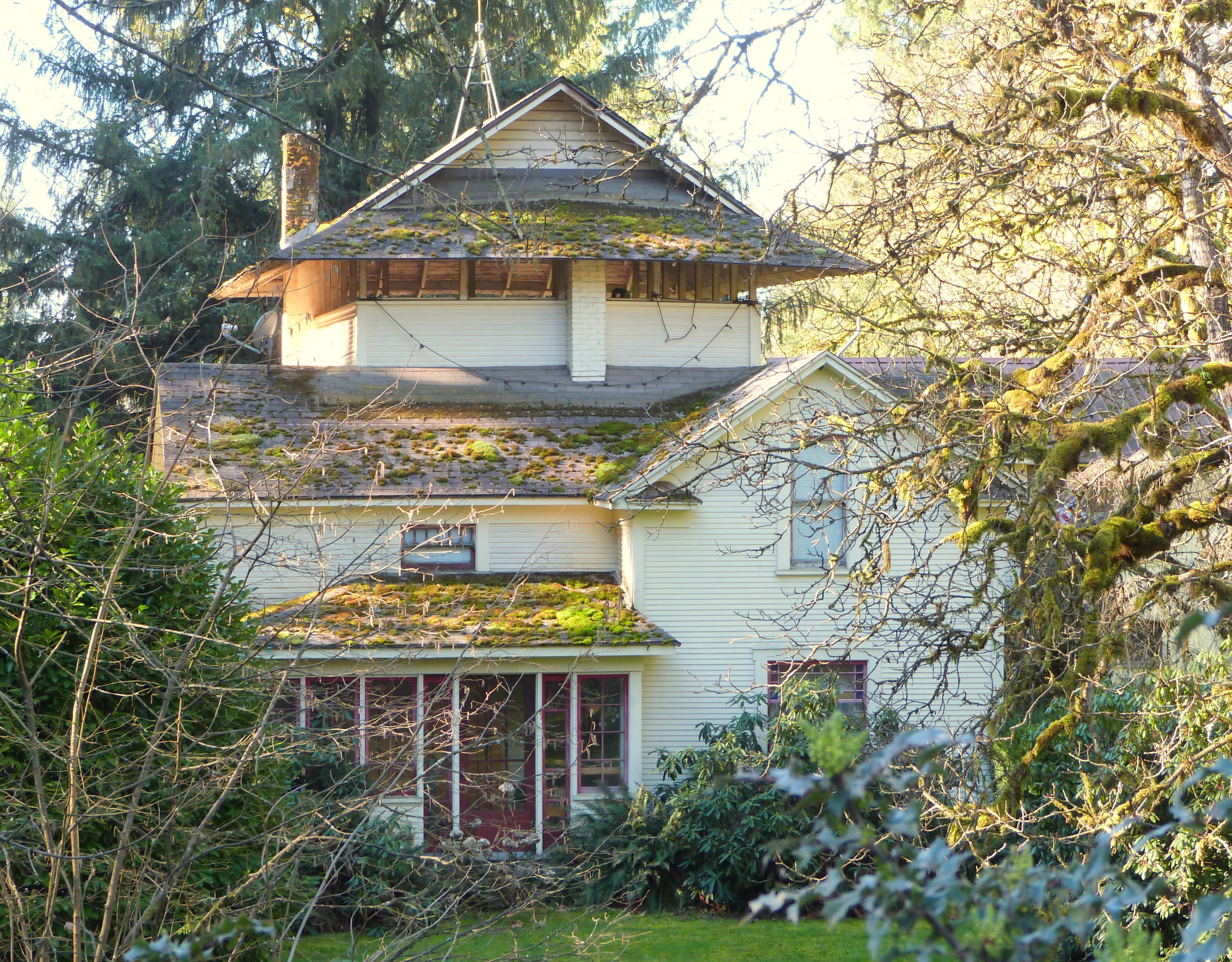
- Albert and Letha Green House

- Location within Washington (state)
- Location: 25716 NE Lewisville Hwy. Battle Ground, Washington
- Coordinates: 45°48′33″N 122°32′53″W
- NRHP reference No.: 82004202
- Added to NRHP: February 19, 1982

The Albert and Letha Green House and Barn is a property located in Battle Ground, Washington listed on the National Register of Historic Places.

== See also ==
- National Register of Historic Places listings in Clark County, Washington
