= Heisson, Washington =

Unincorporated community in Clark County, Washington

Heisson
- Unincorporated community
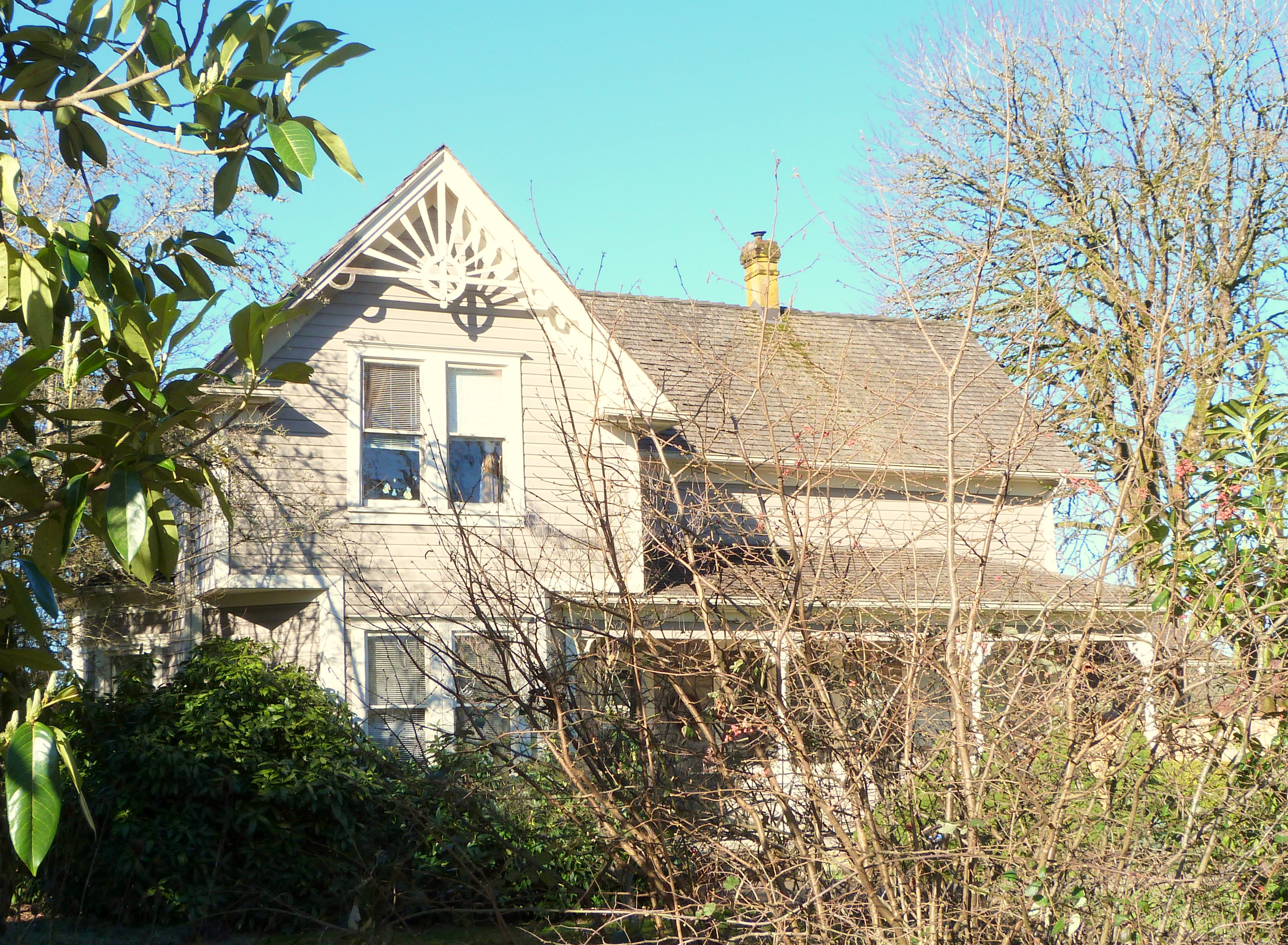
- The historic Henry Heisen House

- Location within the state of Washington Heisson (the United States)
- Coordinates: 45°49′29″N 122°29′28″W
- Country: United States
- State: Washington
- County: Clark
- Elevation: 433 ft (132 m)
- Time zone: UTC-8 (Pacific (PST))
  - Summer (DST): UTC-7 (PDT)
- Area code: 360
- GNIS feature ID: 1520677

Heisson is an unincorporated community in Clark County, Washington.

Heisson lies just north of Battle Ground Lake State Park, south of the East Fork Lewis River, and northeast of Battle Ground, Washington. It consists of a combined general store and post office, along with several houses. Among these houses is the Henry Heisen House, which is listed on the National Register of Historic Places listings in Clark County, Washington. The post office is located adjacent to a crossing for the historic Chelatchie Prairie Railroad.

== History ==
The community was named after German immigrant Alexander Heisen who, along with his family, homesteaded in the area in 1866. The spelling of the community, Heisson, is considered to be in error. Heisen granted land to the government for logging in exchange for having the post office named after him and the post office was founded in 1904, recorded as "Heisson" rather than Heisen. Only the railroad retained use of the "Heisen" spelling. The general store and post office signage, as well as maps, use the modified "Heisson" spelling.

Heisen's son built a home in the area, which is known as the Henry Heisen House and is listed on the National Register of Historic Places. The house is owned by Heisen House Vineyards.

The town flourished until 1923, when the timber was depleted and workers from the Ryan and Allen Mill, located across the East Fork Lewis River, began to move away.
