= Arndt Prune Dryer =

- U.S. National Register of Historic Places
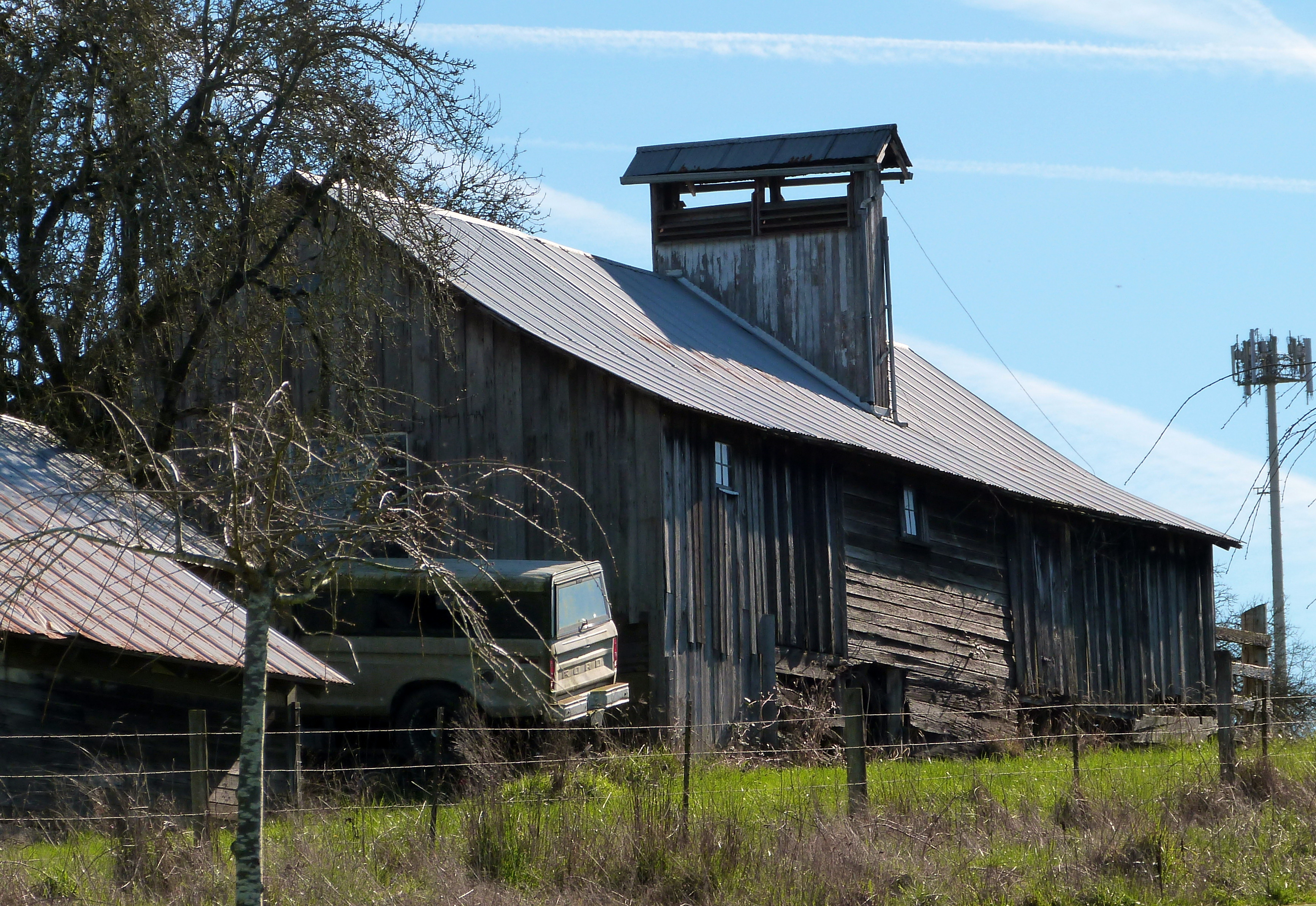
- The Arndt Prune Dryer in 2015

- Location within Washington (state)
- Location: 2109 Northwest 219th Street, Ridgefield, Washington
- Coordinates: 45°46′43″N 122°41′37″W
- Area: less than one acre
- Built: 1898
- Built by: Fred Arndt
- NRHP reference No.: 79002527
- Added to NRHP: October 4, 1979

The Arndt Prune Dryer is a specialized agricultural building in Ridgefield, Washington. Built about 1898, it is one of the last traditional farm-built prune dryer buildings in Washington, using a wood fire and natural draft to dry locally grown fruit. Prunes were a major crop in the Vancouver region, as the dried fruit could be shipped economically to markets without refrigeration or spoilage.

The prune dryer is a one-story wood-frame building, originally about 14 feet (4.3 m) by 15 feet (4.6 m), built for William Arndt by a carpenter. It was expanded to its present size of 230 feet (70 m) by 40 feet (12 m) in 1920 by Fred Arndt. The structure is gabled on its narrow ends, with a shed roofed extension to the rear and a similar extension on the front with a partial porch. The walls are clad with vertical wood siding. A small shed extension is attached to the rear gable. The shake roof is crowned by a tall, narrow wood ventilator with a gabled cap that runs perpendicular to the main roof ridgeline. The whole structure rests on squared stone piers, raising it above the slope of the hillside to allow access to the furnace for stoking. The original site-built furnace was replaced in 1954 by a cast iron "Hercules" furnace taken from another prune dryer. Another stove is located outside to heat water for prune processing.

The Arndt Prune Dryer was placed on the National Register of Historic Places on October 4, 1979. The surrounding lands still have mature prune trees, some planted in the 1890s.
