= Farrell Houses =

Historic house in Arkansas, United States

- U.S. National Register of Historic Places
- U.S. Historic district – Contributing property
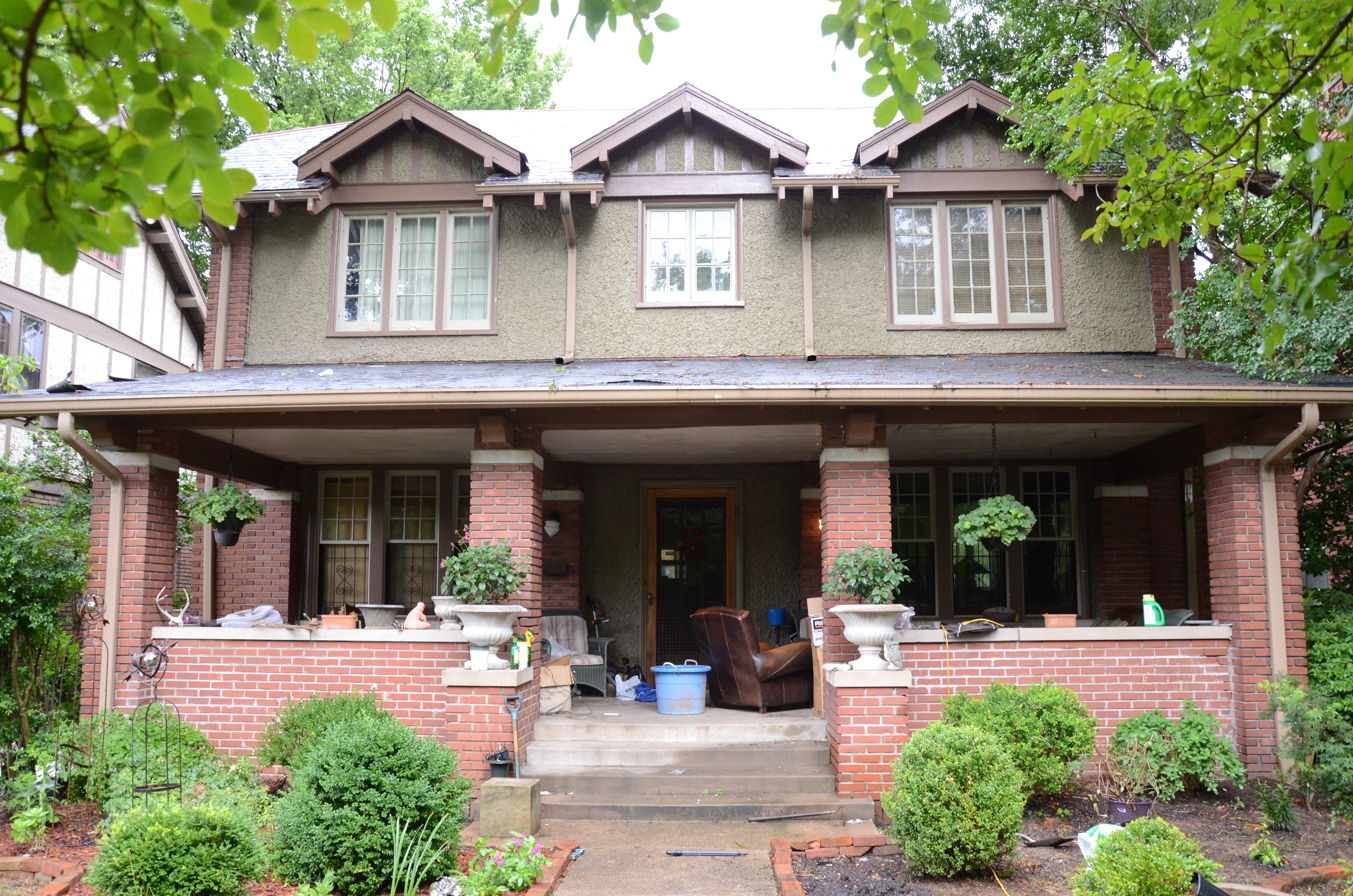
- 2111 S. Louisiana St.

- Location within Arkansas Location within the United States
- Location: 2109, 2111, 2115, and 2121 S. Louisiana, Little Rock, Arkansas
- Coordinates: 34°43′41″N 92°16′28″W
- Built: 1914
- Architect: Charles L. Thompson
- Architectural style: Bungalow/Craftsman
- Part of: Governor's Mansion Historic District (1988 enlargement) (ID88000631)
- MPS: Thompson, Charles L., Design Collection TR
- NRHP reference No.: 82000887, 82000888, 82000889, 84000103

Significant dates
- Added to NRHP: December 22, 1982 (all but 2109 S. Louisiana); October 11, 1984 (2109 S. Louisiana)
- Designated CP: May 19, 1988

The Farrell Houses are a group of four houses on South Louisiana Street in Little Rock, Arkansas. All four houses are architecturally significant Bungalow/Craftsman buildings designed by the noted Arkansas architect Charles L. Thompson as rental properties for R.E. Farrell, a local businessman, and built in 1914. All were individually listed on the National Register of Historic Places for their association with Thompson. All four are also contributing properties to the Governor's Mansion Historic District, to which they were added in a 1988 enlargement of the district boundaries.

The house at 2109 South Louisiana is a two-story frame structure, its exterior finished in dark brown brick and stucco, with a large projecting gable section at the right front. Its roof has exposed rafter ends, and its recessed porch is supported by large Craftsman brackets. 2111 South Louisiana, also two stories, has an exterior of red brick and stucco, with three smaller gabled dormers, and a shed-roof porch. 2115 South Louisiana is differentiated from the first two by having a front-facing gable roof, with a clipped top, and a projecting gabled section on the left. The entrance is to its right, set under a shed-roof porch. The main house finish is red brick, with half-timbered stucco in the gables. 2121 South Louisiana is finished in dark brown brick, with brown-stuccoed half-timbered gable ends, and a cross-gabled tile roof with clipped gable ends that also featured exposed after ends and large Craftsman brackets.

== See also ==
- National Register of Historic Places listings in Little Rock, Arkansas
