= Pidcock =

Pidcock may refer to:

- Pidcock, Georgia, an unincorporated community in the United States

== People with the name Pidcock ==
- Geoffrey Pidcock (1897–1976), senior officer in Britain's Royal Air Force
- James N. Pidcock (1836–1899), American politician
- Joe Pidcock (born 2002), English cyclist
- Laura Pidcock (born 1987), British politician
- Tom Pidcock (born 1999), English cyclist

== See also ==
- Pidcock's Canal, in Gloucestershire, England
- Pidcock Creek (Delaware River), a tributary of the Delaware River, in Pennsylvania, United States
- Pitcock (disambiguation)
