= Farrell Building =

- U.S. National Register of Historic Places
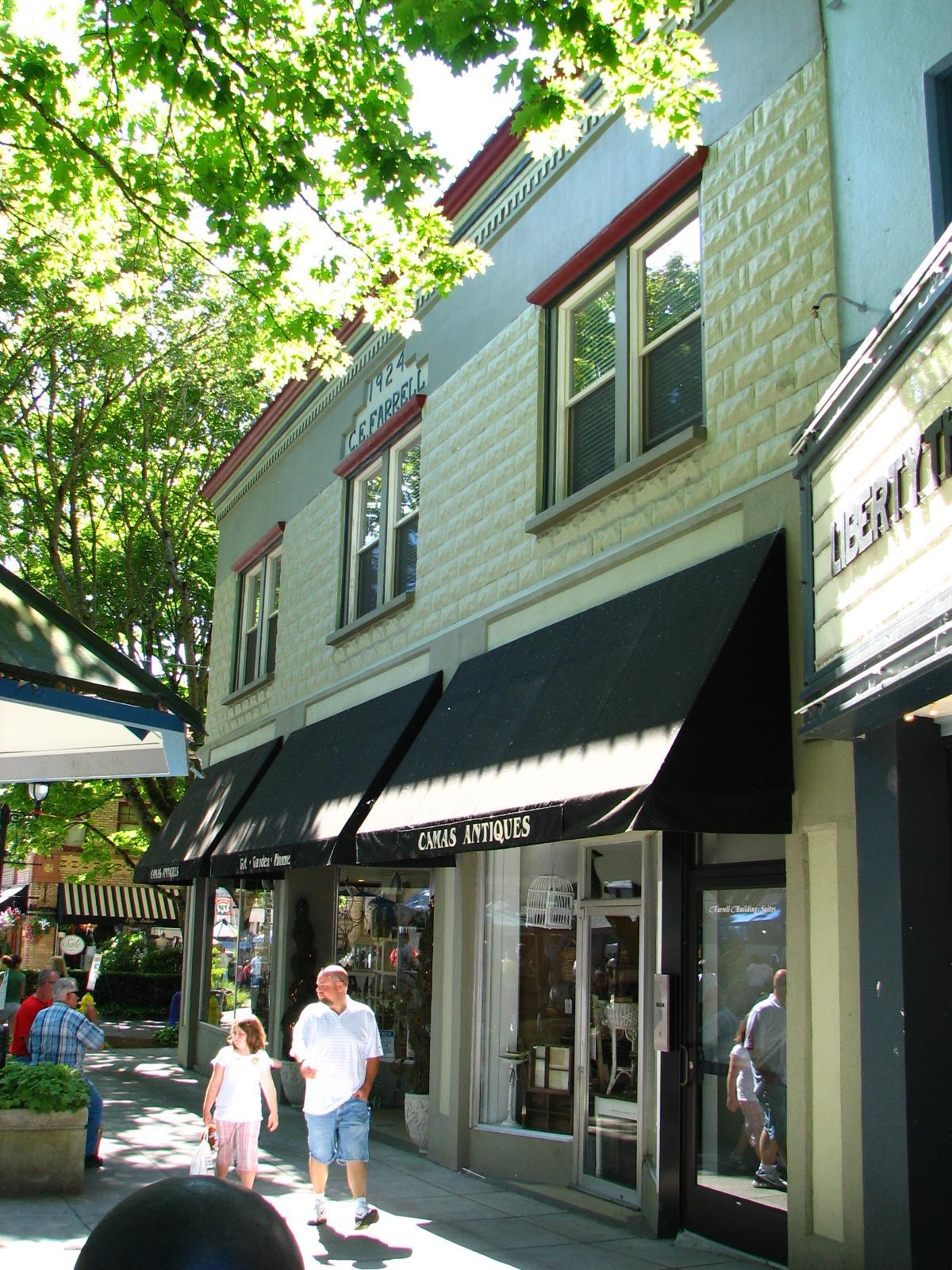

- Location within Washington (state)
- Location: 305 Northeast 4th Avenue, Camas, Washington
- Coordinates: 45°35′08″N 122°24′18″W
- Area: less than one acre
- Built: 1924
- Built by: John Roffler
- Architectural style: Early Commercial
- NRHP reference No.: 06000135
- Added to NRHP: March 15, 2006

The Farrell Building, also known as the Charlie and Rose Farrell Building, the C. E. Farrell Building, the Golden Rule Store, JCPenney, the Fashionette and Farrell & Eddy Department Store, is a historic commercial building located at 305 Northeast 4th Avenue in Camas, Washington. The building was listed on the National Register of Historic Places on March 15, 2006.

The two-story building was completed for Charles Farrell by the local builder John Roffler in 1924 in the early commercial style of architecture. The building replaced a previous 1887 structure which was demolished. The downstairs space was rented to the chain store "The Golden Rule", which later became the JCPenney company.

Charles Farrell's widow Rose and her sister Anna Roffler Eddy moved their "The Fashionette" store into the building in 1935. In 1955, the Farrell Building was closed for modernization in an effort to keep up with other newer department stores.

At the time of its closure in 1998, the building and business was under the ownership of a third generation of the Farrell family.

In 2004, JoAnn Taylor purchased the Farrell Building and renovated all three floors, including the residential apartments upstairs. Taylor opened Camas Antiques on the two lower levels, intending to make Camas a destination location for antiques collectors. Taylor sold the building in 2014, but continued to lease space for Camas Antiques.

== Gallery ==
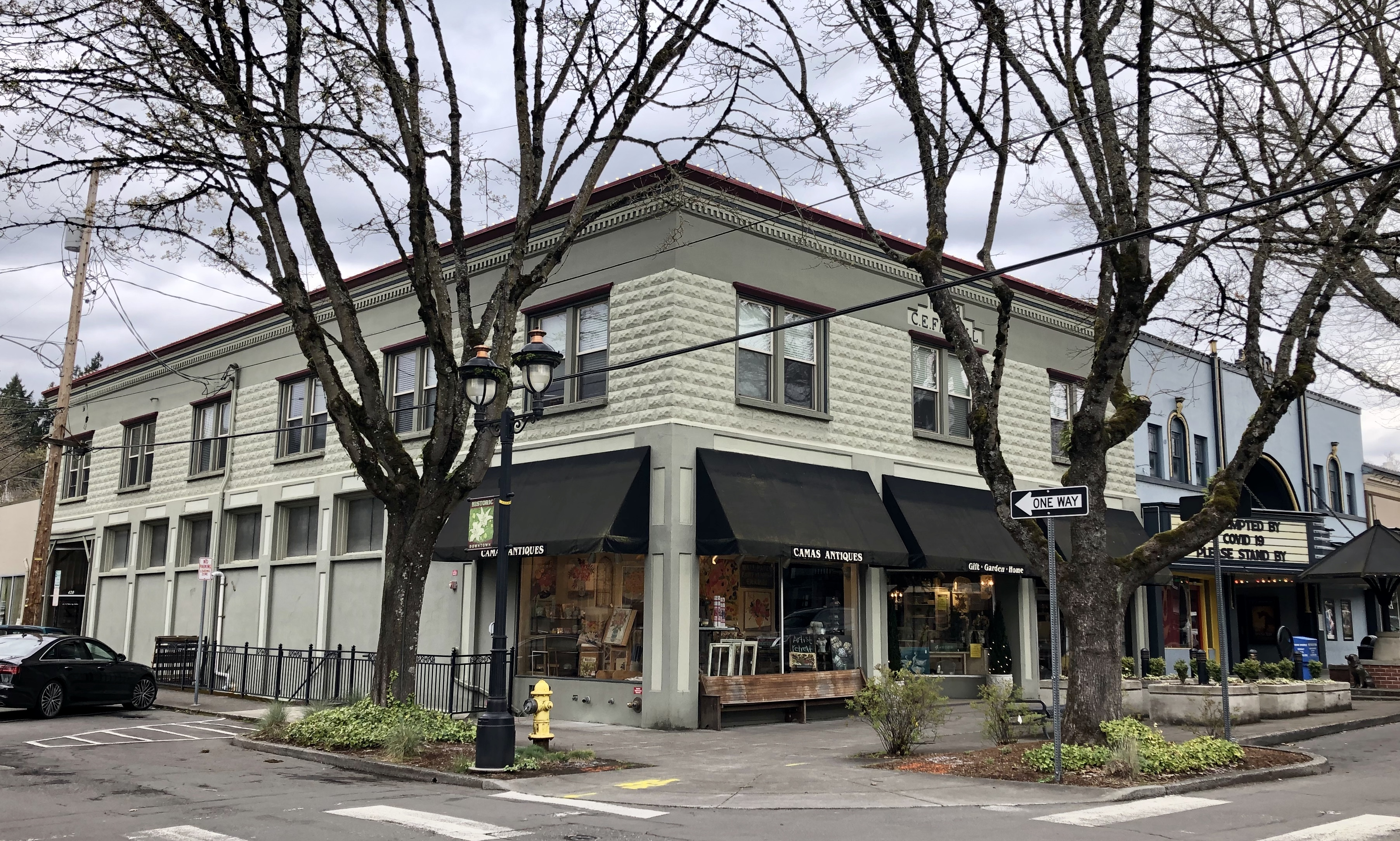
View from across the corner of 4th and Birch. The Liberty Theatre can be seen on the right

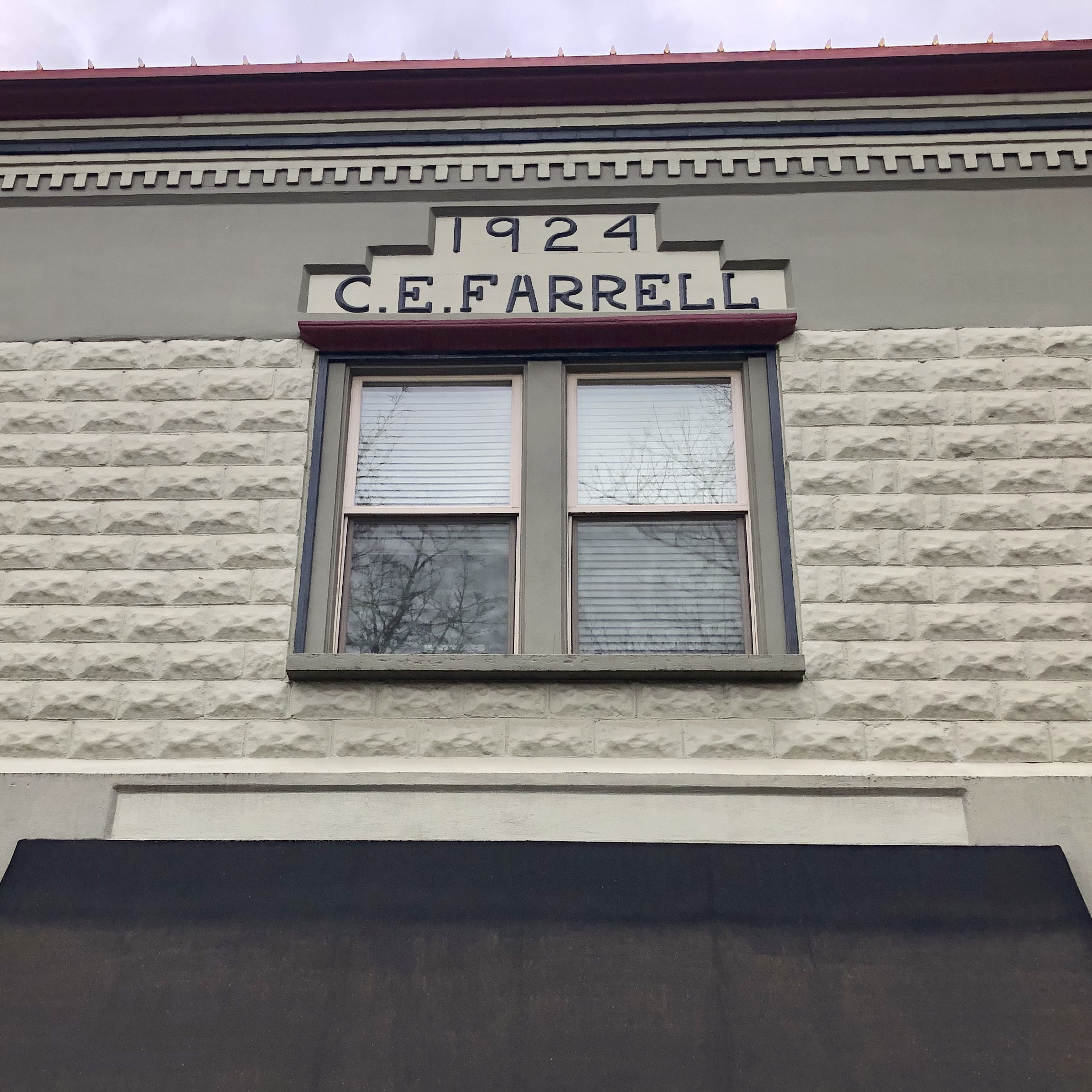
Window detail showing Farrell's name and the construction date

== See also ==
- National Register of Historic Places listings in Clark County, Washington
