= Pittock House =

Historic house in Washington, United States

- U.S. National Register of Historic Places
- Washington Heritage Register
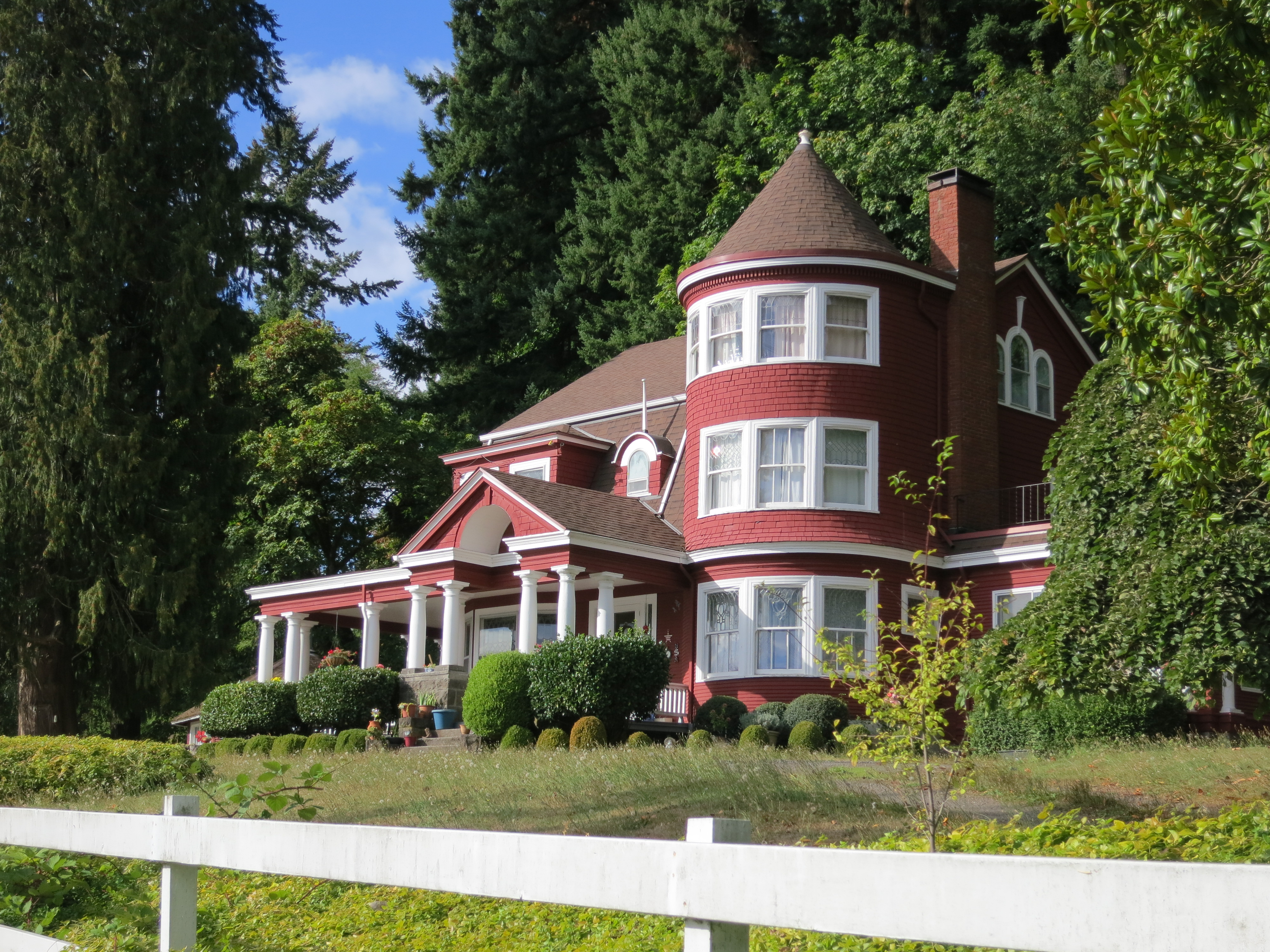
- Pittock House in 2014

- Location within Washington (state) Location within the United States
- Nearest city: Camas, Washington
- Coordinates: 45°37′21″N 122°25′42″W
- Area: 3 acres (1.2 ha)
- Built: 1902
- Architectural style: Queen Anne
- NRHP reference No.: 79003148

Significant dates
- Added to NRHP: 3 July 1979
- Designated WHR: 1979

The Pittock House also known as Lakeside and the Leadbetter House is a historic house located in Camas, Washington, United States. It was listed on the National Register of Historic Places on July 3, 1979.

== Description and history ==
Henry L. Pittock had the house built for his son and daughter–in–law Frederick and Bertha Leadbetter Pittock when they married in 1902. The property is 3 acres (1.2 ha) with 484.2 feet (147.6 m) of shoreline on La Camas Lake.Although it was built as a farmhouse the Queen Anne style building reflects the wealth and stature of the residents. The basic floor plan is a two and half story rectangle, 36 feet (11 m) by 63 feet (19 m) with a prominent three story bay with a conical roof.

== Modern times ==
In 2013 a group of 11 property owners in the north shore area of Lacamas Lake were in the process of moving a development proposal that included preservation of the Pittock House and another property through the county government. The group included Pittock heirs.

== See also ==
- National Register of Historic Places listings in Clark County, Washington
