= House of Providence (Vancouver, Washington) =

Historic house in Washington, United States

- U.S. National Register of Historic Places
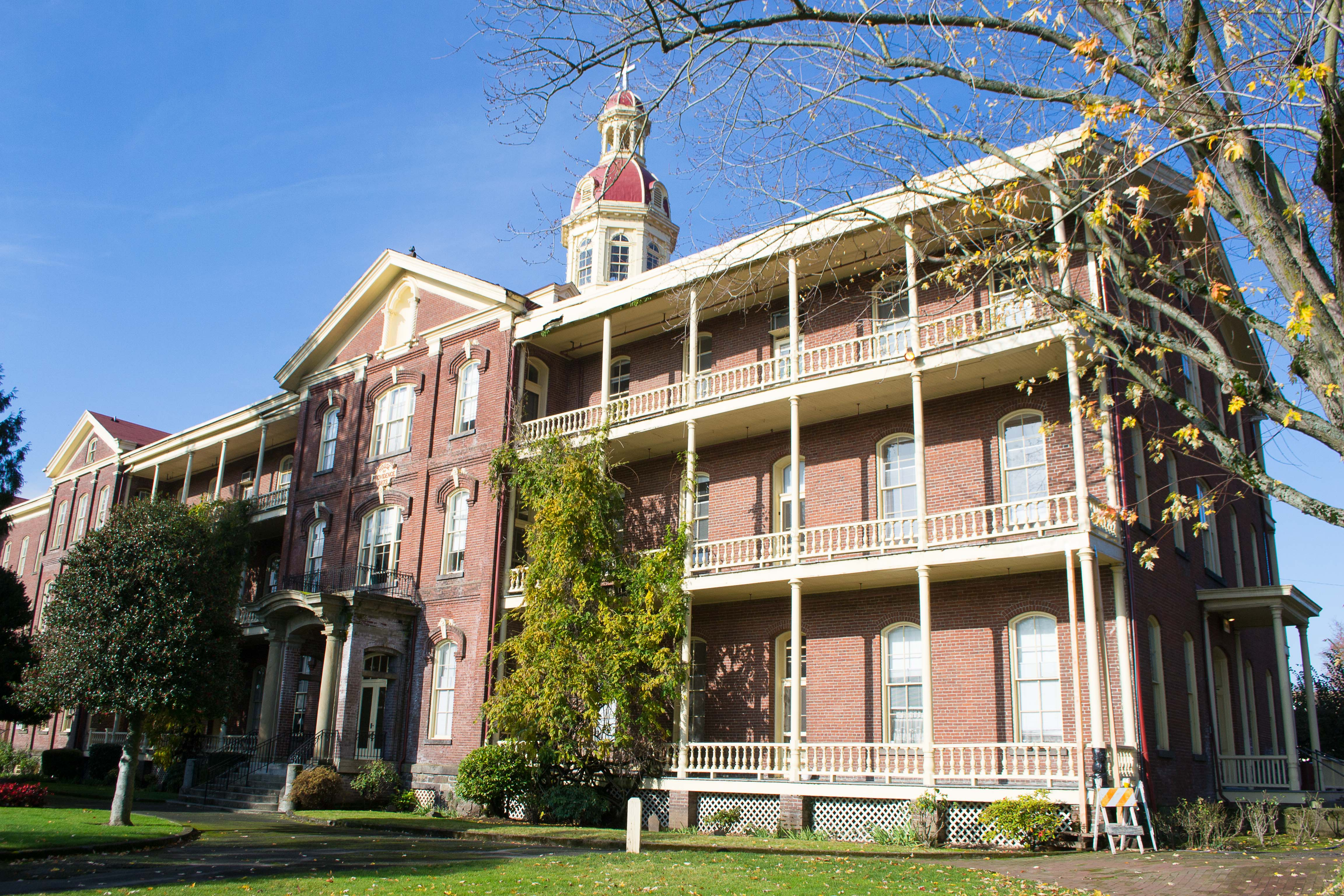

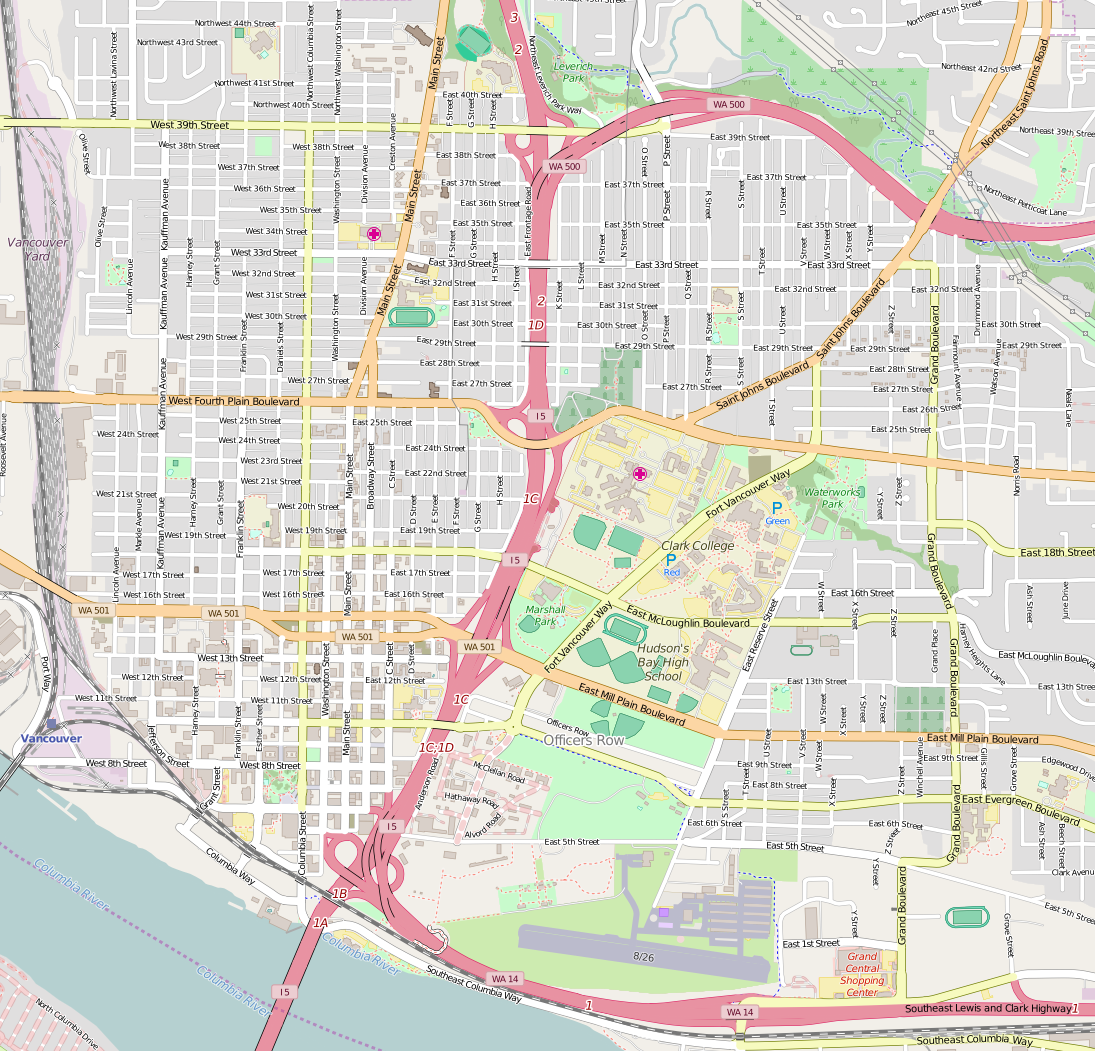
- Location within Vancouver Washington
- Location: 400 E. Evergreen Blvd., Vancouver, Washington, United States
- Coordinates: 45°37′47″N 122°40′1″W
- Area: 7 acres (2.8 ha)
- Built: 1873
- Architect: Mother Joseph Pariseau
- Architectural style: Neo-Georgian
- NRHP reference No.: 78002738
- Added to NRHP: December 1, 1978

The House of Providence, also known as The academy (or Academy building), is a former orphanage and school located in Vancouver, Washington. It was built c. 1873 by Mother Joseph of the Sacred Heart.

== History ==
Mother Joseph Pariseau raised money for the construction of the House of Providence and other charitable institutions by leading begging tours through local mining camps. The building, constructed in 1873 and designed by Pariseau, has three stories and was constructed in brick in a neo-Georgian style. The house functioned as a school until 1969.

It was listed on the National Register of Historic Places in 1978.

== Gallery ==
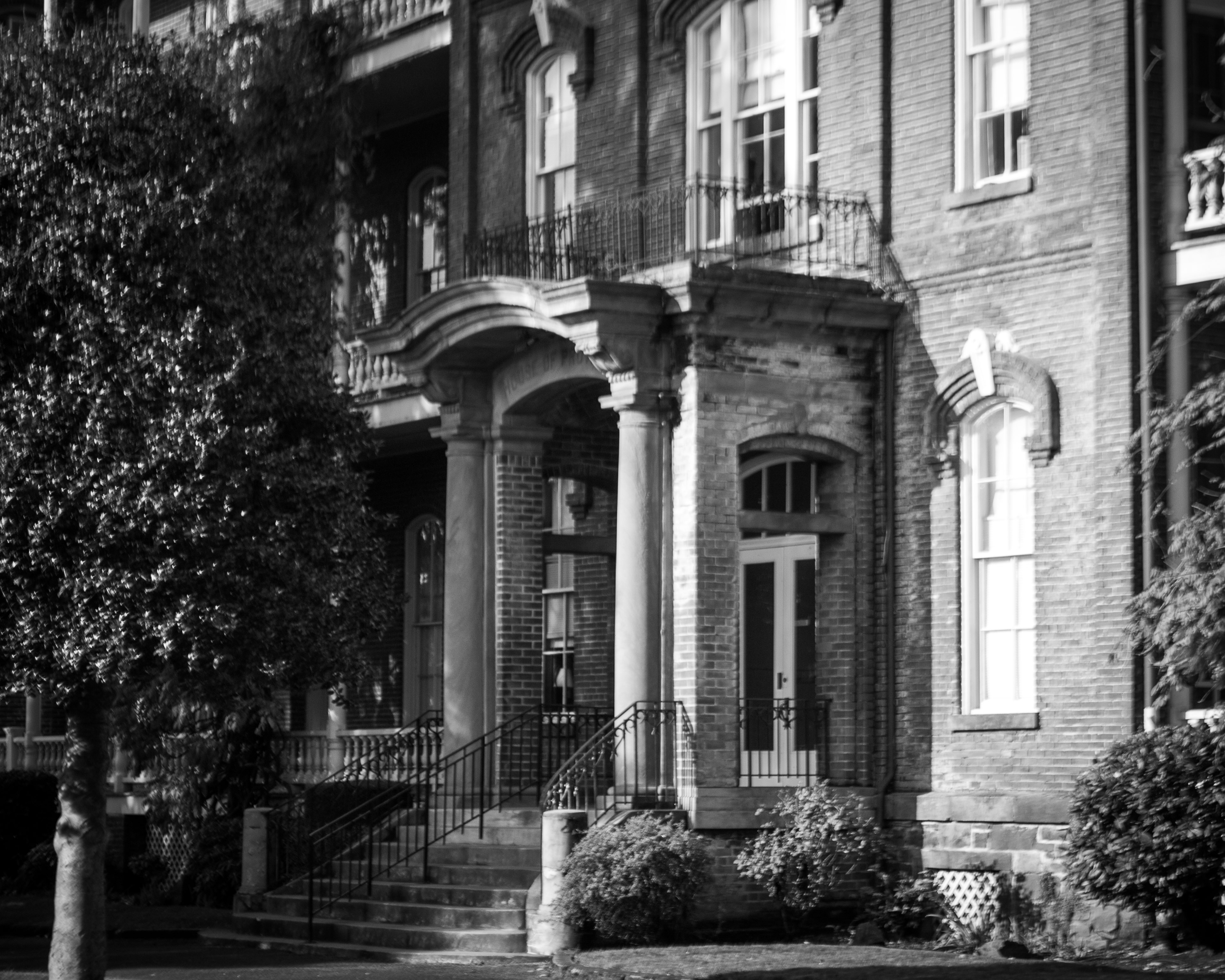
Building entrance

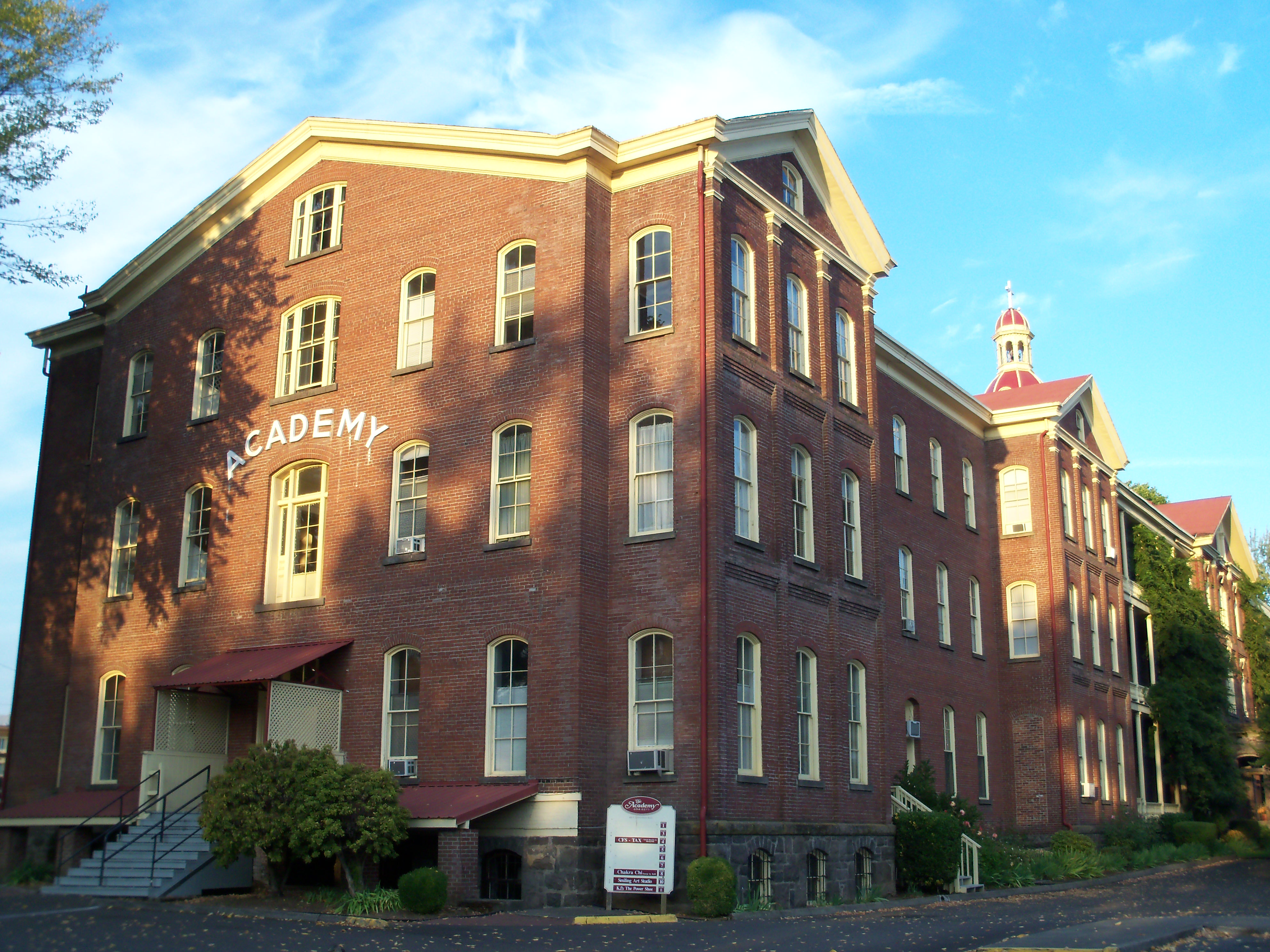
West end of the building

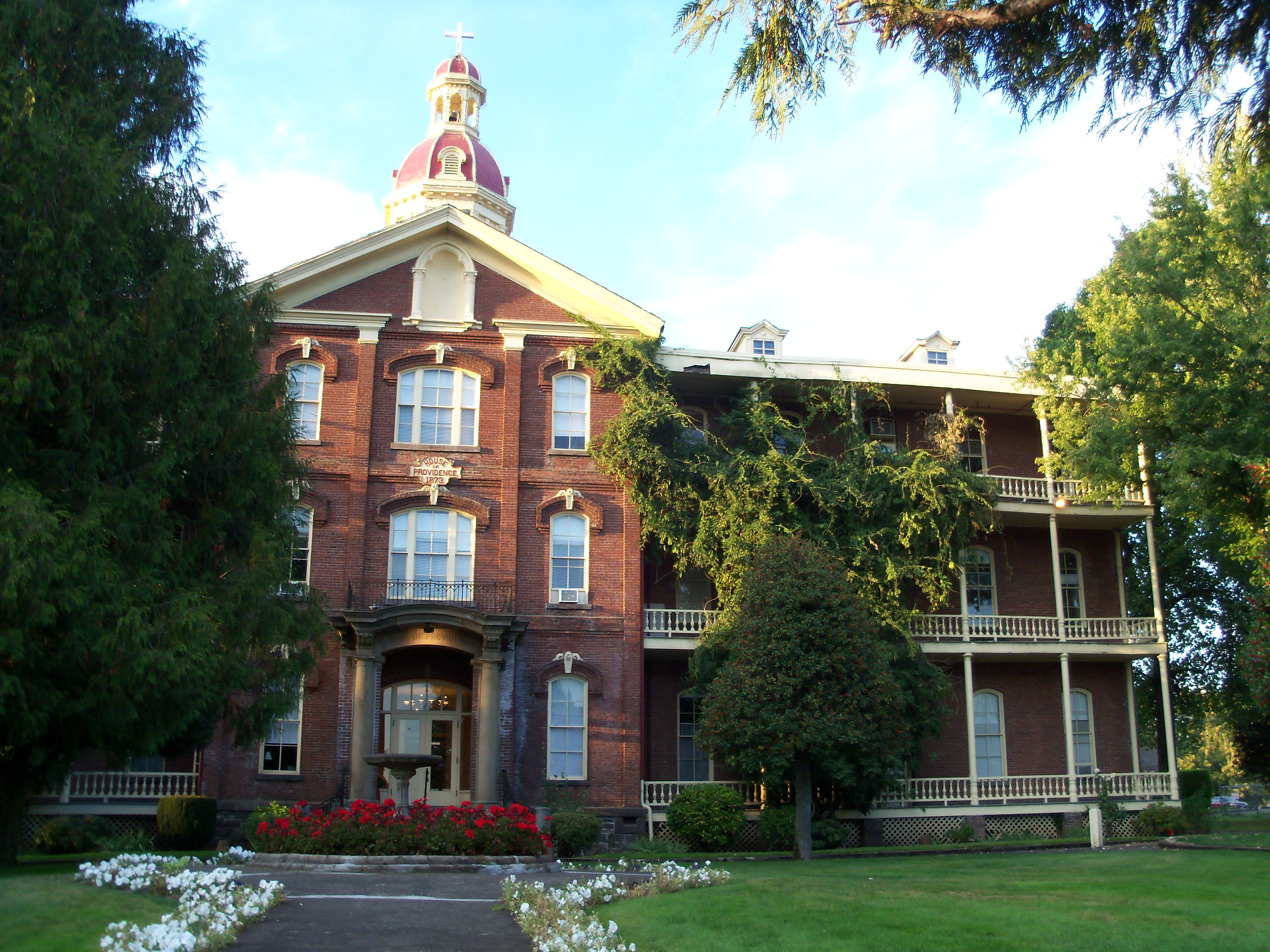
Front of building

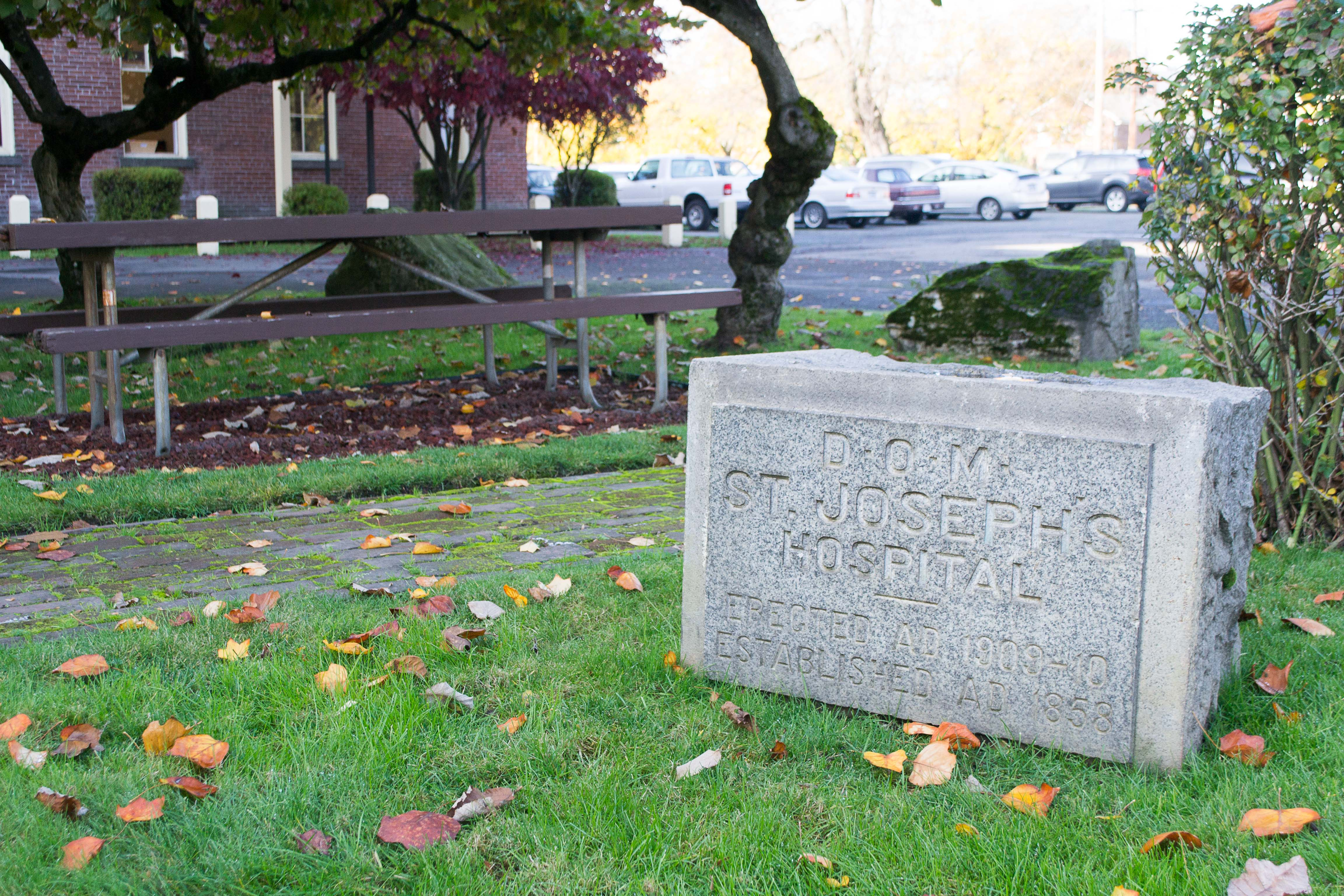
Cornerstone of building

== See also ==
- National Register of Historic Places listings in Clark County, Washington
