= Marengo =

Marengo may refer to:

== Places ==
=== United States ===
- Marengo, Alabama, a community in Marengo County, Alabama
- Marengo County, Alabama, first settled by exiled French Bonapartists
- Marengo, Illinois, the most populous place in the US named Marengo
- Marengo, Indiana, a town
  - Marengo Cave
- Marengo, Iowa, a city
- Marengo, Michigan
- Marengo, Nebraska
- Marengo, Ohio, a village in Morrow County
- Marengo, Lucas County, Ohio, a ghost town
- Marengo, Adams County, Washington, an unincorporated community
- Marengo, Columbia County, Washington, an unincorporated community
- Marengo, Wisconsin, a town
- Marengo (community), Wisconsin, an unincorporated community

=== Elsewhere ===
- Spinetta Marengo, Piedmont, Italy, site of the 1800 Battle of Marengo
- Marengo (department), a department of the First French Empire in northern Italy
- Marengo, Saskatchewan, Canada, a village
- Marengo, Victoria, Australia, a town on the Great Ocean Road
- Murringo, New South Wales, Australia, a town near Young formerly named Marengo
- Hadjout, Algeria, formerly named Marengo

== People ==
- Marengo (surname), an Italian surname

== Other ==
- Battle of Marengo, in 1800 in northern Italy
- French ship Marengo, several vessels
- USS Marengo (AK-194), American cargo ship
- Chicken Marengo, a food dish
- Marengo (spider), a genus of jumping spiders
- Marengo (horse), Napoleon's horse
- Marengo (racehorse), in the 1847 Grand National Steeplechase
- Fiat Marengo, a mid-sized, car-based van from Italian manufacturer Fiat
- Marengo warehouse, a subterranean storage facility in Marengo, Indiana
- Marengo (color), a dark, grayish-black color
- Marengo trial, a court case in the Netherlands

== See also ==
- Morengo, a comune in Italy
