= Bluespring Caverns =

Cave system in Lawrence County, Indiana, US

Coordinates: 38.796193°N 86.546029°W

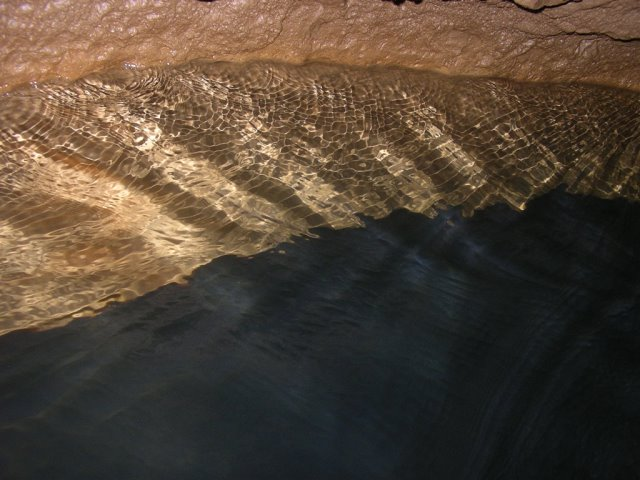
Water and mud walls inside Bluespring Caverns

Bluespring Caverns is a cave system located in Lawrence County, Indiana, approximately 80 miles (128 km) south of Indianapolis. The cave system is a karst and river type cave formation and drains a 15 miles² (38.8 km^{2}) sinkhole plain. The cave contains 21 miles (34 km) of surveyed passages and is most notable for having the longest known subterranean river in the United States with approximately 3 miles (4.8 km) of navigable river.

== Discovery ==
The cave system was discovered as early as the 19th century. Up until 1913, the entrance used was the exodus of a spring which drained into the White River. However, a dam completed in 1913 on the White River closed off this entrance. In 1940, a second entrance was created after a severe storm passed through the area. A small pond on the farm of George Colglazier vanished overnight, becoming a sinkhole, and the present day entrance into the cave system. The undeveloped cave soon had Colgazier's children wanting to learn more about the newest adventure spot on the family's 100-acre (0.40 km^{2}) farm. Although his daughters Uzahne and Janet were not frequent visitors to the cave; his sons, Norman, James, Lee and Daniel were fascinated by the cave. Soon word of the largest opening of Bluespring Caverns spread and the Colglazier family welcomed visitors from around the world as others descended on the small farm to explore the caverns. George Colglazier and his wife, Eva, lived on their family farm and welcomed visitors to the caverns until the death of George Colglazier in the early 1980s. Neither Colglazier nor his wife ever profited from Bluespring Caverns. They made their living as hard-working dairy farmers. They freely allowed cave explorers on their property and asked them to obey one rule, "not to destroy or remove from the caverns".

== Geology and temperature ==
The cave was formed in two types of limestone, separated by a thin layer of shale. The two types of limestone are:

- Salem Limestone
- St. Louis Limestone

The cave remains a constant 54 °F (14 °C) temperature throughout the year.

== Wildlife ==
The cave is host to a number of species, including crayfish, salamanders, crickets, spiders, and beetles. Most notable among these is the rare sightless Northern Cavefish, which is abundant in this cave system. A small number of bats make this cave their home, especially during winter. However, the frequent flooding of this cave system discourages bat habitation year-round.

== Visitation ==
Visitation to the cave is controlled by Bluespring Caverns Park, a commercial corporation. The featured activity is an hour-long boat ride on the subterranean river in a 17-person boat equipped with lighting. This ride is offered seasonally in the months of April through October. The park also offers overnight adventures for organized youth groups from October through April.

Bluespring Caverns are one of five show caves in Indiana. The other four are Marengo Cave, Wyandotte Caves, Indiana Caverns and Squire Boone Caverns. Twin caves, located in Spring Mill State Park, about 15 minutes south of Bluespring Caverns, near Mitchell, Indiana offers a 20-minute boat tour into the cave which goes back about 600 feet (180 m). Twin Caves is owned and operated by the state of Indiana and the Indiana Department of Natural Resources.

== Facts ==
- The cave is the 29th longest in the United States.
- The cave is the 109th longest in the world.
- The cave is the 3rd-longest cave in the state of Indiana.

== See also ==
- Above and Below by artist Maya Lin which was inspired by Lin's exploration of the Caverns, in the collection of the Indianapolis Museum of Art
