= Waterfront Park =

Waterfront Park may refer to:

== Canada ==
- Crystal Beach Waterfront Park, Ontario

== China ==
- Tai Po Waterfront Park, Hong Kong

== United States ==
California

- San Diego County Administration Center#Waterfront Park

District of Columbia

- Georgetown Waterfront Park

Hawaii

- Kakaako Waterfront Park, Honolulu

Kentucky

- Louisville Waterfront Park, Louisville

Massachusetts

- Christopher Columbus Waterfront Park, Boston

New Jersey

- Mercer County Waterfront Park, Trenton

Oregon

- Tom McCall Waterfront Park, Portland

South Carolina

- Waterfront Park (Charleston)

Washington

- Waterfront Park (Seattle)
- Vancouver Waterfront Park
