= Marenco =

Marenco is an Italian surname, which is a variant of Marengo. It may refer to:

- Carlo Marenco (1800–1846), Italian writer
- Cookie Marenco, American music producer and sound engineer
- Giovanni Battista Marenco (1853–1921), Italian archbishop
- Jean McLean Marenco (born 1984), Panamanian football player
- Leopoldo Marenco (1831–1899), Italian writer
- Luiz Marenco (born 1964), Brazilian musician
- Mario Marenco (1933–2019), Italian actor
- Romualdo Marenco (1841–1907), Italian composer

== See also ==
- Marenco Swisshelicopter SKYe SH09
- Marengo (disambiguation)
