= Above and Below =

Artwork by Maya Lin

- Artist: Maya Lin
- Year: 2007
- Type: Epoxy-coated aluminum tubing
- Dimensions: 6.1 m × 30 m (20 ft × 100 ft)
- Location: Indianapolis Museum of Art, Indianapolis, Indiana, United States; 39°49′33.77″N 86°11′10.19″W
- Owner: Indianapolis Museum of Art

Above and Below is an installation by American artist Maya Lin. It is on display at and owned by the Indianapolis Museum of Art located in Indianapolis, Indiana, United States. The artwork was inspired by underground water systems in Indiana.

== Description ==
At 2,000 square feet (190 m^{2}) the sculpture hangs from the ceiling of the Museum's Fortune balcony which is accessible by the Asian Art gallery. It consists of different thicknesses of black painted wire aluminum tubing strewn together in a flowing-like manner as if to depict a river hanging above the viewers head. Above and Below is visible from the 3rd floor galleries and the 4th floor windows.

== Acquisition ==
In 1990 the IMA moved their Asian art galleries to the third floor which featured a balcony overlooking the Virginia B. Fairbanks Art & Nature Park. The IMA's Jane Weldon Myers Curator of Asian Art Jim Robinson sought to showcase Asian art on the balcony and immediately thought of Lin. The size of the 16 ft (4.9 m). x 100 ft (30 m) balcony caused curator and artist alike to struggle on what could be created for the space. At first Lin thought about creating an artwork for the floor of the balcony then she decided to create her installation for the ceiling which would unify the Asian Art and contemporary art galleries. The sculpture was purchased with funds from William L. and Jane H. Fortune with Maya Lin overseeing the installation. In 2008 a new stone floor was installed on the balcony, with stones selected by Lin.

== Design and construction ==
=== Design ===
Maya Lin is known for her major installation works which incorporate terrain and topography – inspirations that assisted in the creation of Above and Below. After years of struggling with the balcony space and lack of topographical landscaping in central Indiana, Lin received a suggestion from an assistant from Indiana stating that "there isn't that much above ground, but did you realize there are these incredibly long underground river systems?"

Lin decided to create an underground river system out of wire, despite telling the IMA she was creating a landscape of rubber. Lin and her team researched the Bluespring Caverns, the Lost River, and the White River. Lin visited the Caverns and worked with U.S. Geological Survey scientists who created an ultrasound map of the tributaries for the artist. Lin said that "I don't think people really understand how intricate and beautiful some of these systems are."

The sculpture seeks to "recreate the experience and feeling" of the underwater landscapes through use of various thickness of wire. Three-fifths of the artwork depict the Bluespring Cavern with the last two sections depicting what is beneath the water level in the cave.

=== Construction ===
Above and Below was fabricated at Walla Walla Foundry in Washington utilizing the bathymetric data gathered from the river bottom and cavern ceiling. Lin's studio translated the data into a collection of contour curves and then sent them to the Foundry. The aluminum tubing was carefully bent to match the computer-generated templates created by the studio then hung within the Foundry. The artwork was then disassembled and shipped to the Indianapolis Art Museum and installed in the course of a freezing cold week on the outside balcony. Lin has created other artwork installations which she describes as "drawing in space" including Where the Land Meets the Sea (2008) in the collection of the California Academy of Sciences.

== Reception ==
Art historians at the IMA have described the piece as being easily placed within the minimalist and postminimalist tradition due to artists of those movements bringing landscape and nature into the gallery through exploration of environments on a larger scale.
