= Confluence Project =

Maya Lin works by the Columbia River

The Confluence Project is a series of outdoor installations and interpretive artworks located in public parks along the Columbia River and its tributaries in the U.S. states of Washington and Oregon. Each art installation explores the confluence of history, culture and ecology of the Columbia River system. The project draws on the region's history, including Native American traditional stories and entries from the Lewis and Clark Expedition journals, to "evoke a landscape and a way of life submerged in time and memory." The project reaches from the mouth of the Columbia River to Hells Canyon.

Artist Maya Lin designed installations that followed the path of Lewis and Clark through the Columbia River Basin. Lin collaborated with landscape architects, such as Johnpaul Jones, to produce earthen works that helped restore natural environments. Each artwork was based on traditions grounded in Native American cultures and drew text from Lewis and Clark's journals.

== Sites ==
=== Washington ===
- Cape Disappointment State Park, Ilwaco, Washington (completed 2005, dedicated 2006)
- Ridgefield National Wildlife Refuge, Vancouver, Washington (in planning stages)
- Vancouver Land Bridge at Fort Vancouver National Historic Site, Vancouver, Washington (completed in 2008)
- Sacajawea State Park, Pasco, Washington (completed in 2010)
- Chief Timothy Park, Clarkston, Washington (scheduled for completion in Spring 2015)

=== Oregon ===
- Sandy River Delta Bird Blind (completed in 2008)
- Celilo Falls (on hold)
