= Grant Street Pier =

Pier in Vancouver, Washington, U.S.

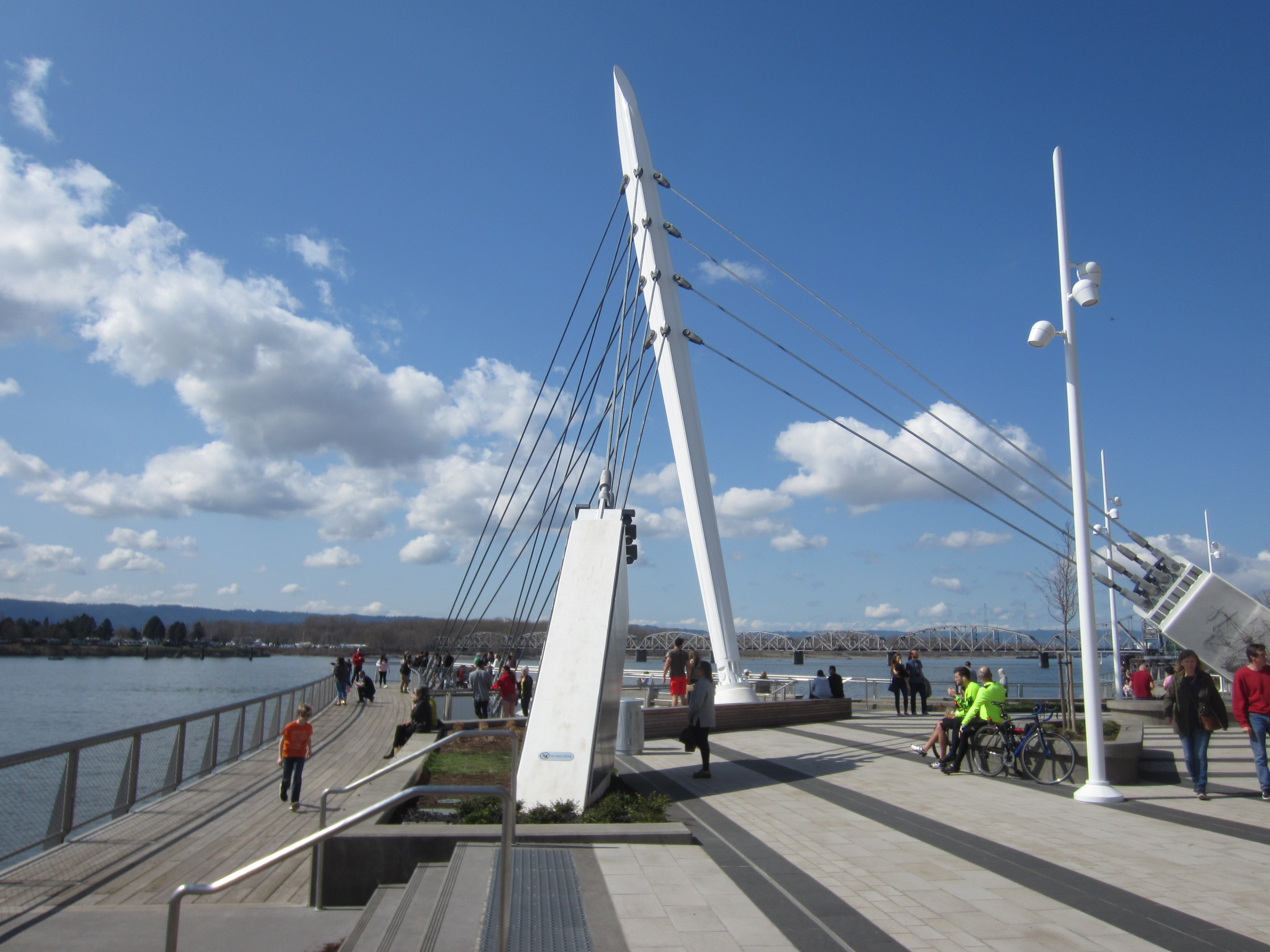
- The pier in 2019
- Location: Vancouver, Washington, U.S.
- Coordinates: 45°37′25.7″N 122°40′51.73″W

History
- Location of Grant Street Pier

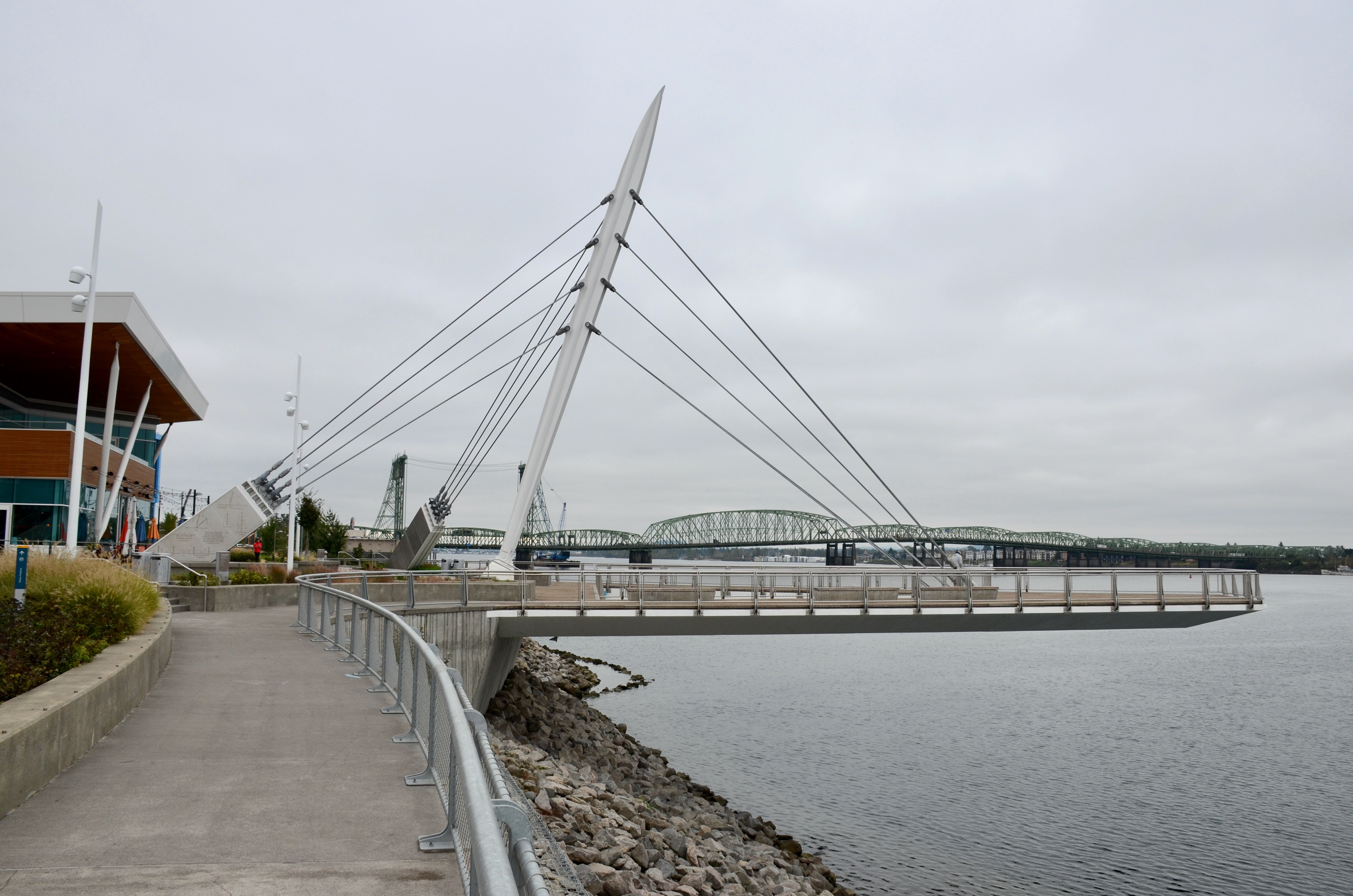
Side view, 2020

The Grant Street Pier is a feature of the Vancouver Waterfront Park in Vancouver, Washington, United States.

== History ==
Ground broke in 2016.

== Reception ==
In 2019, the structure received an American Public Works Association Award.
