= Vancouver Land Bridge =

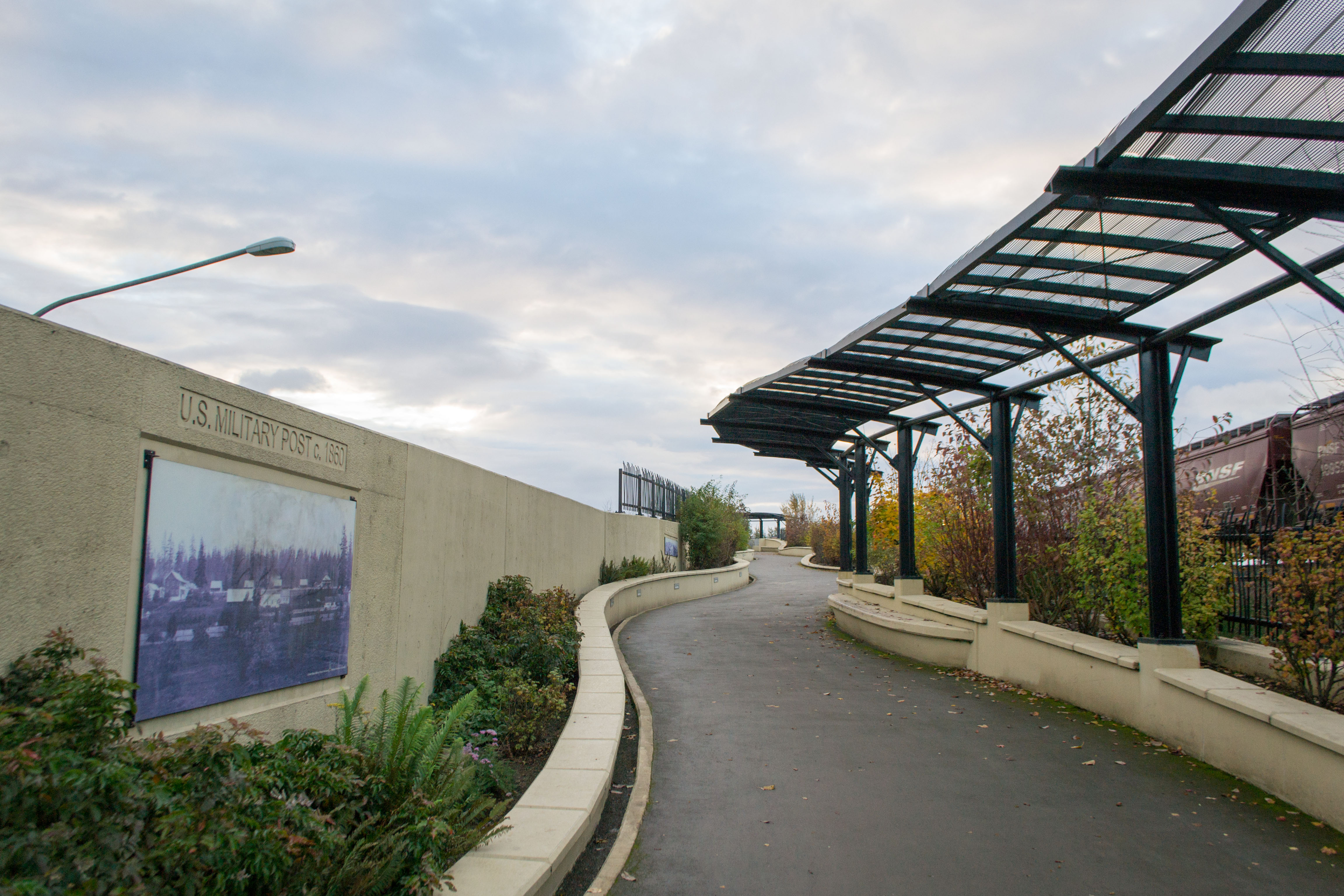
- Part of the bridge in 2013
- Coordinates: 45°37′15″N 122°40′00″W
- Locale: Vancouver, Washington, U.S.

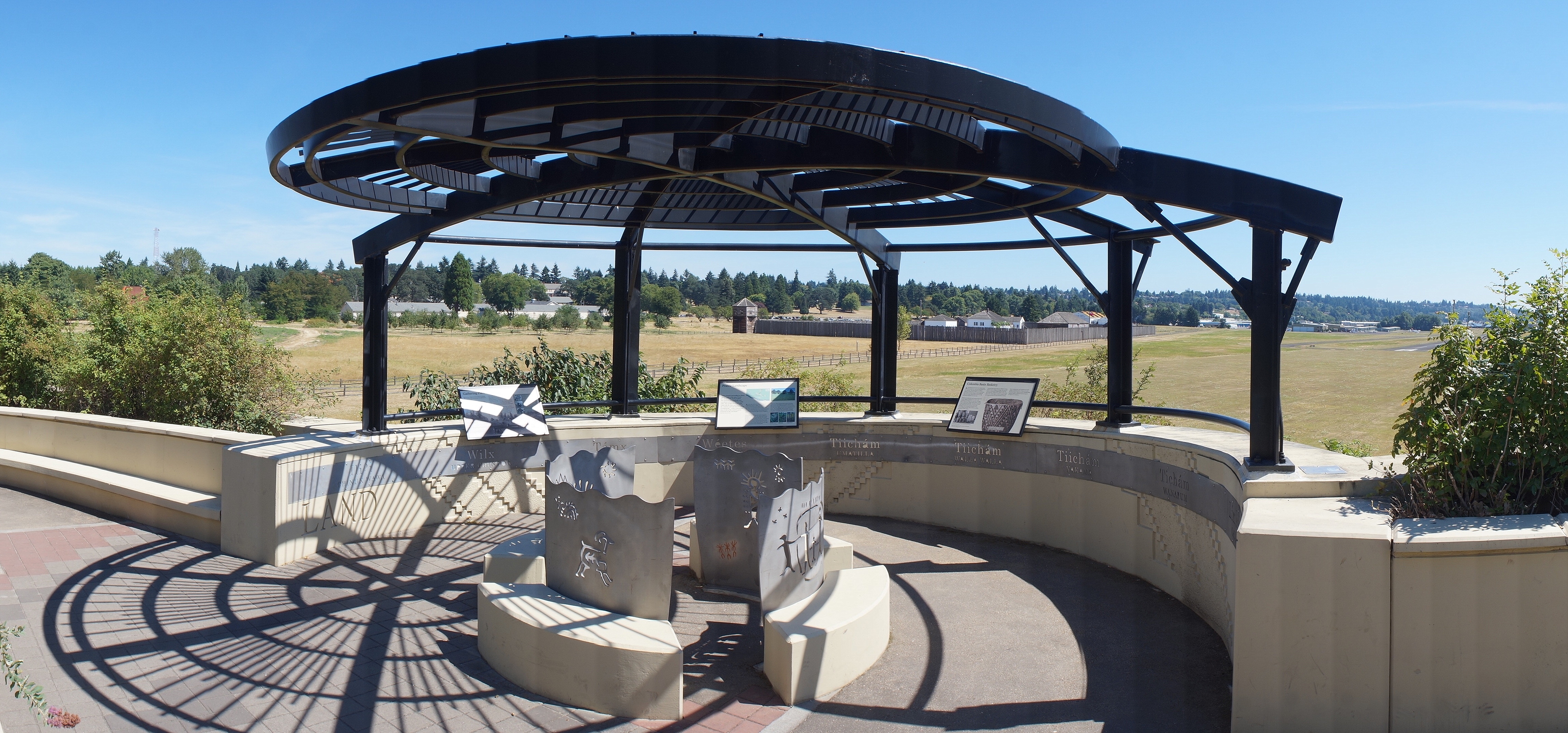
One of the bridge's observation points, overlooking Fort Vancouver

The Vancouver Land Bridge connects Vancouver Waterfront Park to the Vancouver, Washington portion of the Fort Vancouver National Historic Site using a path similar to an ancient Native American trail. The bridge, which spans Highway 14, has been described as "the most visible part of the larger" Confluence Project.

Designed and built as a collaborative effort between Pacific Northwest Native American tribes and architects Johnpaul Jones and Maya Lin, the bridge is 1/3rd of a mile long and the location specifically chosen by Native American tribes in the Columbia River watershed to mark a cultural and spiritual symbolic area.
