= Langston Hughes Library =

Library in Tennessee, United States

Coordinates: 36.156248°N 84.088638°W

The Langston Hughes Library is a private non-circulating library designed by American architect Maya Lin, and located on the Haley Farm in Clinton, Tennessee. It contains a 5,000-volume reference collection focusing on works by African-American authors and illustrators, and books focused on the Black experience.

== Location and history ==
Haley Farm was once owned by Alex Haley, writer and the author of the 1976 book Roots: The Saga of an American Family. The farm was purchased by the Children's Defense Fund in 1994. It is now run as a retreat center, with training and conference facilities, the Riggio-Lynch Interfaith Chapel, guest cottages, and the library. The farm consists of 157 acres (0.64 km^{2}) surrounded by ridges of the Appalachian mountains, and is 25 miles (40 km) north of Knoxville. The grounds of the farm include streams, a lake, an apple orchard, and a ropes course.

The Langston Hughes Library was dedicated on March 19, 1999. The dedication ceremony was attended by such important figures as Maya Angelou, Hillary Rodham Clinton, John Franklin, and Toni Morrison. The Children's Defense Fund and its sister organization, the Black Community Crusade for Children, run this library as an incubator for the CDF's "Leave No Child Behind" movement.

== The building ==
The library is a 1,200 square foot 2-story building with a single reading room upstairs and entryway and a small bookstore in the south corn crib. The reading room was designed to be a flexible space, allowing for public readings or personal study areas, as needed.

An 1860s refurbished barn and two corn cribs comprise the exterior skin of the building. The rustic exterior, which evokes the "architectural vernacular of 19th-century East Tennessee, a plain language of silvery, time-worn siding, rough logs, and minimal geometries" is melded with modern Shaker-like simplicity on the interior.

Maya Lin pointed out that the function of the exterior and that of the interior were different and thus she "wanted to make a real cut between outside and inside…there didn't seem to be much point in preserving the rustic feel of the barn's interior".

One of the most striking aspects of the design are the glass-encased corn cribs that act as a base for the cantelievered barn that sits atop them. Margaret Butler of Martella Associates states that the glass between the logs "glows like a Chinese lantern" at night.

=== The architect ===
The Library was designed by Maya Lin, most famous for her Vietnam Veteran's Memorial in Washington DC., and who also created the Civil Rights Memorial in Montgomery, AL. Martella Associates, Knoxville, were the architect of record.

Lin explains her vision: "The idea was to maintain the integrity and character of the old barn yet introduce a new inner layer…expressing the idea of a separate inner skin slipping inside the old barn". "I'd never seen a shape like that before and wanted to save it….once I realized that the book collection was small and the library would be used as an intimate gathering space, I came up with the concept of an elevated reading room".

=== Building materials ===
The exterior skin consists of a reclaimed barn and two corncribs, held together with glass and steel bars. "Crib walls are supported by threaded steel rod, expressing this new architectural element, instead of hiding it".

The interior spaces use new materials: maple and particleboard, sisal mats and recycled soybean husk tabletops designed by Lin. The materials chosen were either recycled or "green". Natural daylight floods the interiors via large skylights and windows, reducing the need for artificial lighting. The exterior space between the two cribs incorporates a small stone fountain that gives the "'transitory' space a new life and making a positive space out of a void". A nearby pond is used "as a natural heat exchanger to help reduce the library's energy costs".

=== Critical response ===
A critic for the Seattle Post-Intelligencer appreciates "the quiet, reductive clarity of her work" and states that Lin "has transformed a barn into a Frank Gehry-like marvel of colored light and air". Alex Ross of Stanford University considers the library a "marvelous example of adaptive re-use."

== The library ==
The Children's Defense Fund purpose in building the Langston Hughes Library was to "connects young leaders and activists with the glorious heritage of the struggle for freedom, and is where policy makers and community builders come to connect, recharge their spiritual and physical batteries" and act as a "training ground for the next generation of leadership, advocacy and service for children and families". Architect Maya Lin states that her mission in creating the library was to "create a fluid transition between a building and its site, so that you will always feel connected to the land"

=== Collection ===
"The collection specializes in publications about children's advocacy; spirituality; nonviolence; the Civil Rights Movement, with particular attention to the role of women; women's leadership; African American history, literature, and culture; African culture and history; and children's literature. Special highlights of the collection are the hundreds of books that have been chosen as CDF Freedom Schools books". Original manuscripts of seminal works in African-American literature are being collected. Internet-based access Tennessee Electronic Library (TEL) databases is available for academic research.

=== Users ===
The Langston Hughes Library's patrons include activists, students, tourists, dignitaries, scholars. Class visits are held, festivals are hosted and retreats are accommodated at the Haley Farm. Events such as the Langston Hughes Library Roundtable, Langston Hughes Children's Literature Festival and African American Read-In are regularly held at the Haley Farm.

=== Librarians ===
Khafre Abif, currently at the Cleveland Public Library, was the first director of the library. He expressed his desire to reach children directly as his impetus to seek his MLS. Abif spoke about children's library services, "this is where it begins, if you do it right at this age you will have library lovers for life and you won't have to convince adults of the power of libraries, they'll already know". He acted as director of the Langston Hughes Library through at least 2002.

=== Funding and future projects ===
The building project was partially funded by Barnes & Noble CEO Len Riggio and his wife Louise. Ongoing funding for acquisitions and operations are provided by the Children's Defense Fund. Planned improvements to the Haley Farm include "a Walking Path to Commemorate the Cloud of Witnesses for Social Justice" and an Outward Bound camp. Maya Lin also designed the Riggio-Lynch Chapel located on Haley Farm, built in 2004, making Haley Farm "the only site in the United States with two Maya Lin structures".
