= Marengo warehouse =

Underground warehouse in Indiana, US

Coordinates: 38°22′05″N 86°20′26″W

The Marengo warehouse and distribution center is a subterranean storage facility located in Marengo, Indiana, located about 35 miles northwest of Louisville, Kentucky. It is one of the largest underground storage facilities in the United States.

The complex is located 160 feet (49 m) underground in a former limestone quarry and comprises nearly 4 million square feet of space. The warehouse is used by the US Department of Defense for storage of approximately 10 million Meals, Ready-to-Eat (MREs); by Bridgestone for storage of 400,000 tires; and by Controlled Pharming Ventures for growing tomatoes and corn. The warehouse maintains a constant ambient temperature range of 56 to 60 °F (13 to 16 °C) throughout the year.

== History ==
The location of the warehouse in southern Crawford County was first explored as a source of limestone on June 10, 1886, due in part its proximity to a railroad. Joseph Garrow first quarried rock from an open quarry at the site. The Garrow Brothers Company operated the Garrow Rock Quarry starting in 1887. In 1916, ownership of the quarry was ceded to David M. Seyton and Arthur B. Harris, investors who had financed the continued operation of the mine after the death of Joseph Garrow's brother, Milton.

The quarry operated as an open pit quarry until 1936 when Rudy Messinger purchased it and renamed it High-Rock Mining Company. Underground mining began, using a room and pillar approach.

In 1984 Marengo, LLC acquired the quarry and continued to mine limestone. Two years later, the quarry was first leased as a storage facility to the US federal government for grain storage. In 1995, the company began modernizing the quarry for use as warehouse space.

By 2002, around 600,000 square feet were in use, and the facility employed around 40 people.

In 2012, the US Defense Logistics Agency (DLA) award a contract for $563,711 to the Marengo warehouse for storage.

As of 2013, twelve separate warehouse have been constructed in the quarry, totaling more than 1.3 million square feet. The company plans to complete an additional 16 warehouses, bringing the total storage capacity to more than 3 million square feet.

== See also ==
- Granite Mountain (Utah) - The Church of Jesus Christ of Latter-day Saints family history records archive
- Marengo Cave - A limestone cave near Marengo warehouse
- Svalbard Global Seed Vault - A subterranean doomsday seed vault
