= Indiana Caverns =

Cave in Indiana, United States

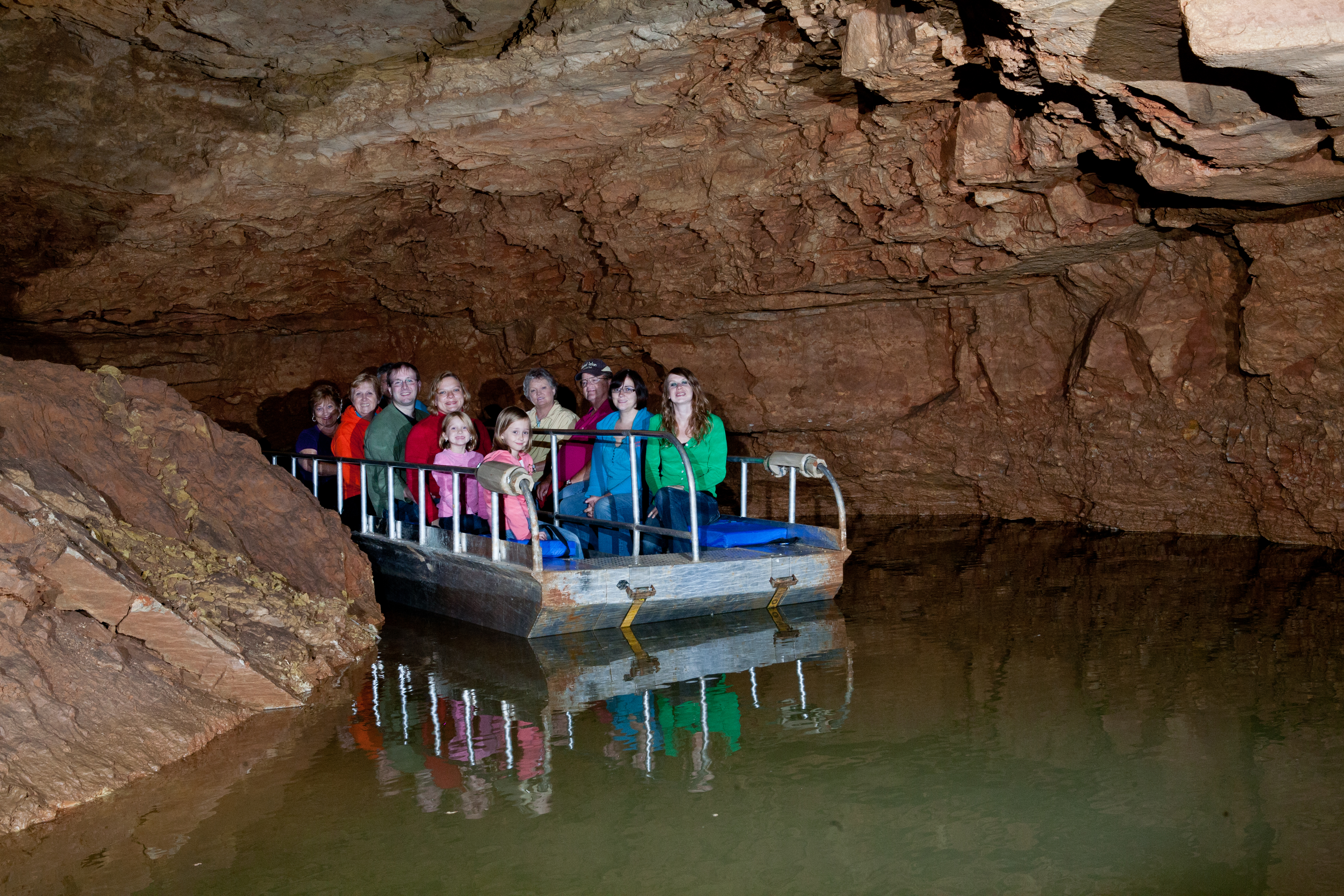
- A portion of Indiana Caverns's boat ride

- Location within Indiana Location within the United States
- Location: Harrison County, Indiana
- Nearest city: Corydon
- Coordinates: 38°10′58″N 86°09′00″W
- Owner: Private
- Website: indianacaverns.com

Indiana Caverns is part of the Binkley Cave system near Corydon, Indiana.

== History ==
In 1918, an 81.5 acre farm less than a mile south of Corydon was purchased by Arvel H. Miles. A sinkhole entrance to Binkley Cave opened on the farm at some point prior to a set of explorations in the 1930s. In 1944, the farm was purchased by Harvey Binkley, for whom the cave is now named. Most of the exploration of the cave has been done by the Indiana Speleological Survey.

In 2010, Shane Myles and Tim Pride discovered an area now called Blowing Hole Boulevard. Blowing Hole Boulevard's west end is an eighty-five-foot tall room called Big Bone Mountain, named for several sets of animal bones found in the room. Subsequent excavations by the Indiana State Museum have determined the bones to originate from Pleistocene Ice Age animals.

In 2012, the Indiana Speleological Survey began investigating a possible connection between Binkley Cave and nearby Blowing Hole Cave. A passageway thought to connect the two caves was partially blocked by breakdown rock, but dye testing and smoke bombs showed an air and water exchange between the two caves. Digging on both sides allowed cavers in both caves to shake hands through the rocks. This disproved the idea that the two caves were separate; they are now proved to be one cave. This connection made the Binkley Cave system thirty-five miles long - solidifying it, perhaps permanently, as the longest cave in Indiana.

Development of Indiana Caverns began on June 1, 2012; the cave opened to the public on June 15, 2013.

The Indiana Speleological Survey continues to explore Binkley Cave. Through the use of color dye in waterways, two local springs have been identified as the final destination of two yet unexplored cave passageways. Exploration of these waterways would add several miles to the cave's explored length. As of the end of 2015, the surveyed cave length was 42.57 miles with the potential for at least ten miles to be discovered in the distant future.

=== Geology ===
The Indiana Caverns portion of Binkley Cave is almost entirely located in St. Louis Limestone, which is a thinly bedded limestone of Mississippian origin. St. Louis Limestone includes beds of chert and shale (the chert is showcased on the tour). Brachiopods and coral are apparent in the rock on the show tour.

Binkley Cave is a solutional cave formed from the dissolution of limestone by underground streams containing carbonic acid. The water takes the path of least resistance by running along the faults, fractures, and bedding planes of the limestone. The thinly bedded St. Louis limestone can be quite fissile, meaning it is weakest along straight planes. This weakness along the planes helped lead to breakdown events after the cave's initial formation, leaving behind flat surfaces on the ceilings and walls.

Calcium bicarbonate is carried into the cave by drips of water. When the slightly pressurized calcium bicarbonate hits the air of the cave, the carbon dioxide is released, and the calcium carbonate precipitates out of the water. The calcium carbonate, in the form of the mineral calcite, a solid, crystallizes onto the bottoms and sides of existing stalactites, stalagmites, helictites, and sheets of flowstone to grow the formations over time. Other minerals are brought into the cave by flowing of water to create white, red, tan, and gray colors on the formations and walls.

St. Louis Limestone is primarily made of calcite, but is also known to contain magnesium sulfate, manganese dioxide, ferric oxide, gypsum, dolomite, and aragonite. On the show tour, deposits of calcite, manganese dioxide, and ferric oxide are apparent. The top portion of the St. Louis Limestone layer through which the tour goes includes the Lost River Chert Bed, a layer of rock containing sheets of chert, a siliceous rock, which is also apparent on the cave tour.

== Ice Age ==
Because of the presence of Pleistocene fauna bones in the cave, it is believed that the top of the Big Bone Mountain room once featured a large natural opening that both opened and closed during the Pleistocene era. Carbon dating on three sets of bones in the cave indicate that the animals entered the cave circa 38,000 years BP, which would have been 17,000 years prior to the last glacial maximum. During the last glacial maximum, the glaciers of the Wisconsin glaciation extended past present-day Indianapolis. The earlier Illinoian glaciation extended glaciers all the way to the Ohio River, but stopped short of the Crawford Upland as the Mitchell Plain, in which Indiana Caverns sits. Almost all of Indiana's caves exist along a thin area between Bloomington and Harrison County, which was never glaciated. This information is based on private correspondence between Indiana Caverns and the Indiana State Museum.

=== Species ===
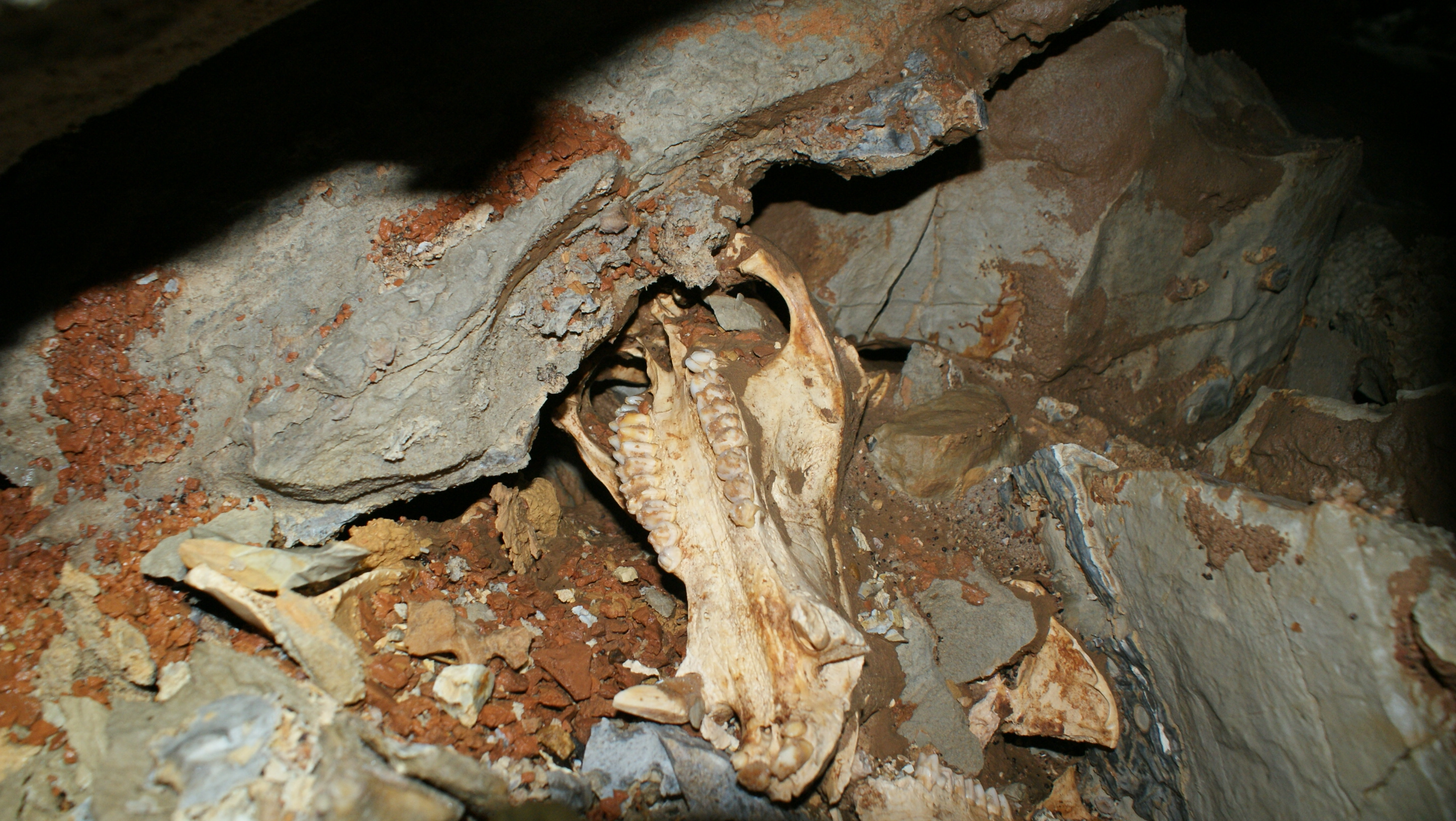
A portion of a flat-headed peccary skull found in the cave. Two such skulls are shown on the tour.

The species identified by the Indiana State Museum so far are:

- Flat-headed peccary, which is shown on the tour and are found in the cave in very large numbers.
- The first known case of northern flying squirrel in the state
- Southern flying squirrel
- Porcupine
- Passenger pigeon
- Barred owl
- Vole
- Garter snake
- Southern red-backed vole
- Black bear

There are also bones of unknown species from a bird, a frog, a fish, and a shrew.

== See also ==
- List of attractions and events in the Louisville metropolitan area
- List of longest caves in the United States

Other show caves in Indiana

- Wyandotte Caves
- Bluespring Caverns
- Squire Boone Caverns
- Marengo Cave
- Tours of Twin Caves at Spring Mill State Park
