= Diane R. Wolf =

American arts patron (1954–2008)

- Born: 1954; Cheyenne, Wyoming, US
- Died: January 10, 2008 (aged 53–54); New York City, New York, US
- Occupation: Philanthropist

Diane R. Wolf (1954–2008) was an American philanthropist, and arts patron who is credited with paving the way for the redesign of U.S. coinage.

== Personal life ==
Diana R. Wolf was born in 1954 in Cheyenne, Wyoming and grew up in Denver, Colorado. Her parents, Joyce Mandel Wolf and Erving Wolf, were the founders of the Erving and Joyce Wolf Foundation whose art collection is very famous. She had two brothers, Matthew and Daniel. Her former sister-in-law was the prestigious artist and Presidential Medal of Freedom recipient Maya Lin.

Wolf received her undergraduate degree from the University of Pennsylvania in 1976 and a master's degree in early childhood education from Columbia University in 1980. In 1995, she earned a law degree from Georgetown University Law Center.

She lived in both Manhattan and Washington, D.C. and died in 2008.

== Career ==
Wolf served on the Metropolitan Museum of Art Junior Committee and the Whitney Museum of American Art Friends Council and was a supporter of the Frick Collection, all in New York City. She was also a supporter of the UJA Federation of New York. Wolf was the past president of the Federal Bar Association, Capitol Hill Chapter

Wolf was appointed by President Reagan to the U.S. Commission of Fine Arts from 1985 to 1990. She was the youngest person to be appointed at that time and took the place of Edward Durell Stone Jr. During this time, she led the campaign to update the designs on the United States' coinage in order to drive demand by collectors and reduce the federal deficit by potentially $2.3 billion, a figure that was coined by David C. Harper, the editor of Numismatic News and ally. With the support of the California Senator Alan Cranston and Rep. Henry B Gonzalez (D-Tex), the proposed bill passed through the House of Representatives but was blocked in the Senate.

Wolf was described as a person who "dies on every molehill."

Her lobbying efforts in the 1980s have been credited for paving the way for this legislation in 2000 and the 2020s.

She served on the Rockefeller University Council for 15 years, where she supported medical research. She was a benefactor of the Metropolitan Museum of Art.

Wolf served on the following boards:

- U.S. Senate Preservation Board of Trustees
- The Library of Congress Madison Council
- The Foundation for the National Archives Board of Trustees
- The National Public Radio Foundation Board of Trustees
- The National Trust for Historic Preservation Council
- The Georgetown University Law Center Board of Visitors
- The Kennedy Center National Committee for the Performing Arts
- The International Committee on the Arts
- The National Symphony Orchestra National Trustees
- The Washington National Opera Board of Trustees
- The Smithsonian Council of American Art

== Legacy ==
On Wednesday, January 23, 2008, John L. Mica (R-FL) spoke several remarks in the House of Representatives in honor of Wolf's passing.

A similar event occurred on January 22, 2008 in the United States Senate.

After her death, her brothers donated an art piece to the National Gallery of Art in her honor.

== Additional sources ==
- Paul M. Green, The One Person Who Made a Difference, "Numismatic News" (July 4, 1988): 18.
- Thomas E. Luebke, ed., "Civic Art: A Centennial History of the U.S. Commission of Fine Arts" (Washington, D.C.: U.S. Commission of Fine Arts, 2013): Appendix B.
- Bill McAllister, Maverick in the Realm of the Coin, "Washington Post" (December 5, 1989): C1.
- Timothy Rolands, Wolf Remembers Coinage Redesign Campaign, "Numismatic News" (February 2, 1999): 14.
