= Sandy River Delta =

Protected area in Oregon, United States

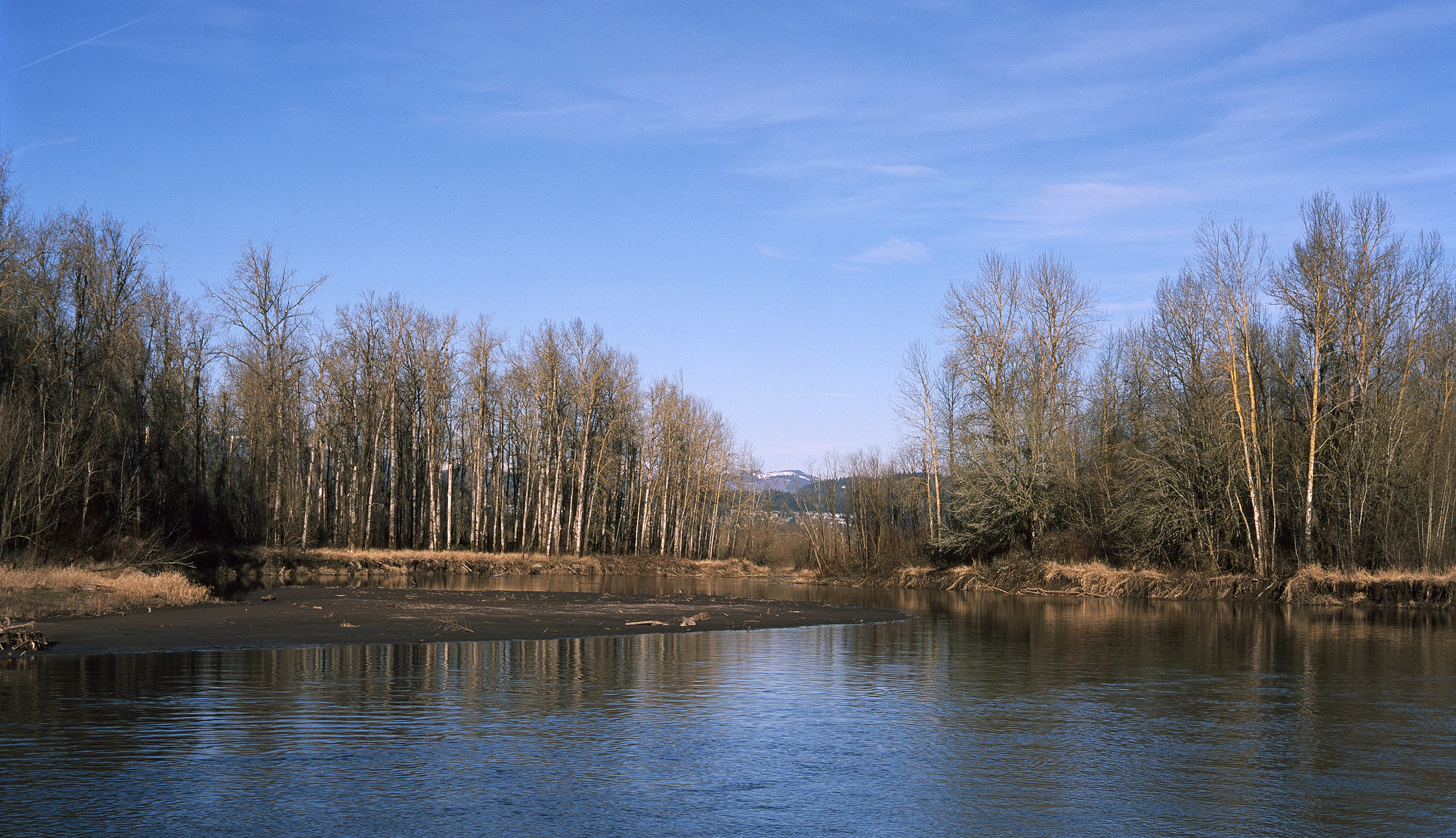
- The Sandy River at the delta

- Location within Oregon
- Location: Multnomah County, Oregon
- Nearest city: Troutdale, Oregon
- Coordinates: 45°33′11″N 122°22′01″W
- Area: 1,400 acres (5.7 km^{2})
- Established: 1991
- Governing body: United States Forest Service

The Sandy River Delta is a natural area at the confluence of the Sandy and Columbia rivers in Oregon. Also known as "thousand acres", Sandy River Delta is composed of 1,400 acres administered by the United States Forest Service as part of the Columbia River Gorge National Scenic Area near the Portland metro area and the city of Troutdale.

== History ==
The Lewis and Clark Expedition passed through the area twice, in November 1805 and spring of 1806, noting abundant wildlife and stopping to hunt and gather food. During most of the 20th century the land was owned privately as part of a cattle ranch, until the 1950s when a portion was acquired for the construction of Interstate 84, which now forms the southern boundary of the area. The Forest Service acquired the remaining property north of I-84 in 1991.

The area's management use plan has focused on low impact, non-motorized recreational use at the gateway to the Gorge, in addition to habitat restoration for native plants and wildlife. A 1930s dike was removed in 2013 by the Corps of Engineers to restore the free flow of the river, and efforts have been made to reduce the prevalence of invasive species like Himalayan blackberry and reed canarygrass.

== Facilities and recreation activities ==
As the farthest northwestern edge of the Columbia Gorge scenic area, Sandy River Delta is a popular location for hiking, dog walking, horseback riding, and waterfowl hunting. The 1.25 mile Confluence Trail is an ADA accessible trail that leads to a bird blind installed as part of the Confluence Project and designed by Maya Lin.

Although off-leash dog walking is allowed (unlike in most of the Gorge), it is not a dog park, but rather a multi-use natural area; commercial dog walking is prohibited. Waterfowl hunting via shotgun only is allowed north and east of the Bonneville Power Administration lines crossing the area. The area is open dawn to dusk, with parking available for a fee or via recreation pass.
