= Women's Table =

1993 sculpture by Maya Lin at Yale University

- Artist: Maya Lin
- Year: 1993

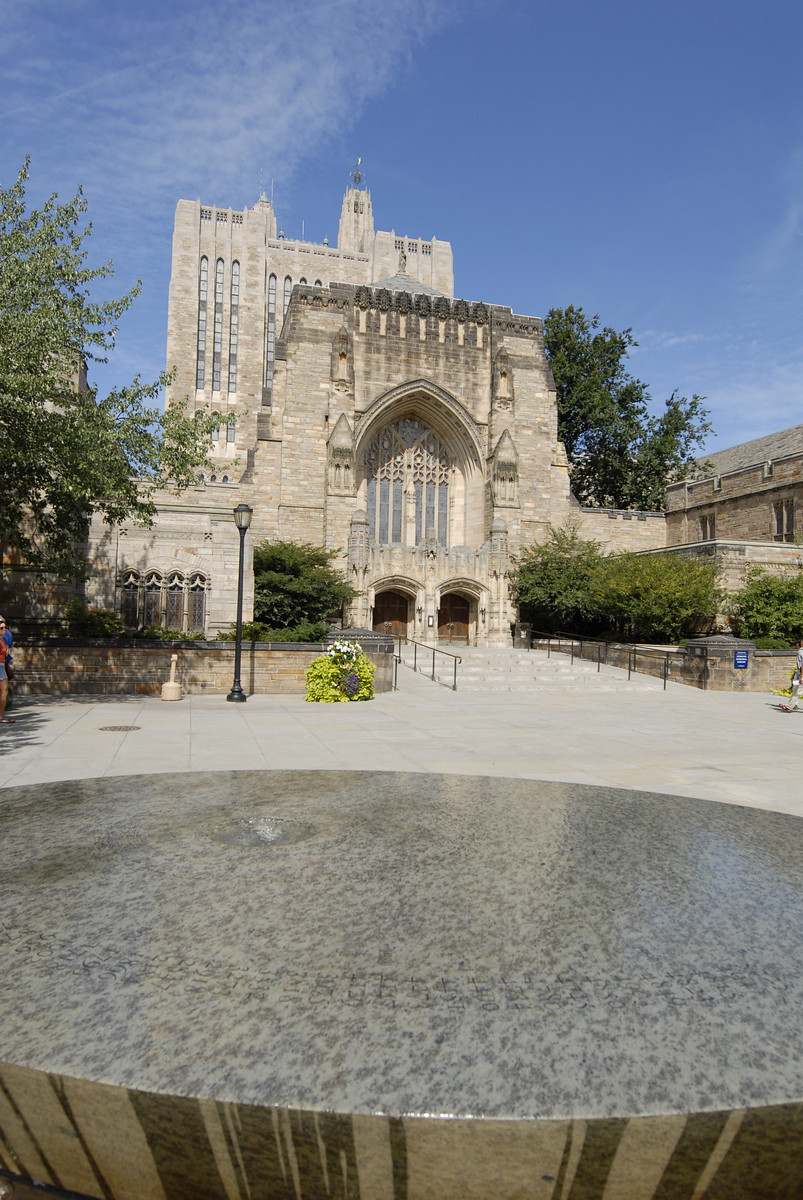
The Women's Table in front of the Sterling Memorial Library at Yale University

The Women's Table is a 1993 sculpture by Maya Lin in front of Sterling Memorial Library at Yale University. Made of black stone carved with a spiral of numbers marking the enrollment of women in the university in a given year, the work is dedicated to the many women who had been underacknowledged presences at the university since the 19th century. Lin, a graduate of Yale College, was commissioned to create the work in 1989, the twentieth anniversary of the admission of women to Yale College. After the work had been installed and unveiled, visitors noticed that the inscription carved into the table erroneously called it the "Womens' Table," misplacing the apostrophe. The error has since been fixed, although the patchwork remains visible.
