= Captain George Vancouver Monument Plaza =

Memorial plaza in Vancouver, Washington, U.S.

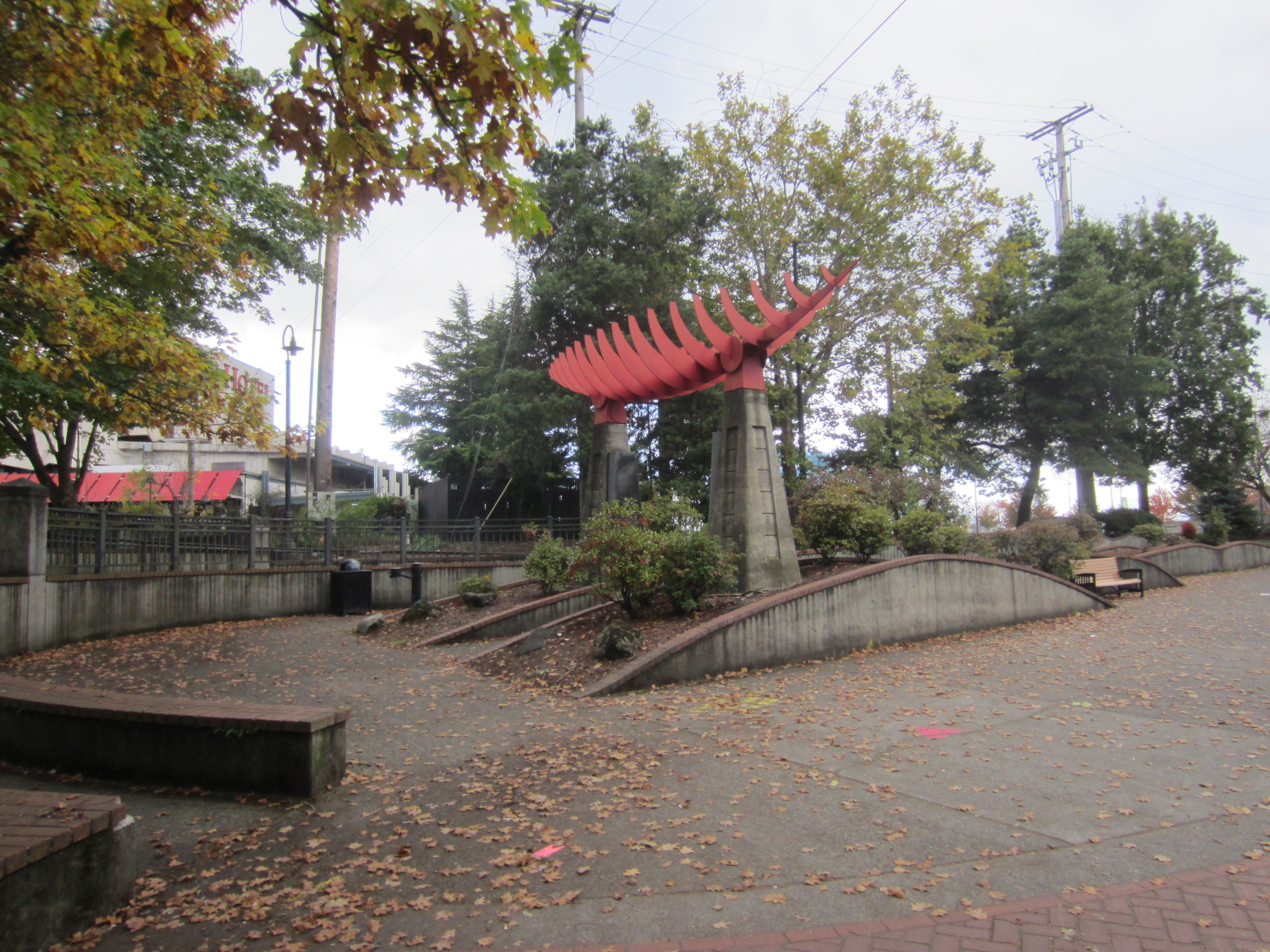
- The plaza and sculpture in 2020
- Location: Vancouver, Washington, U.S.
- Location within Washington (state)
- Coordinates: 45°37′18″N 122°40′26″W

The Captain George Vancouver Monument Plaza is a memorial plaza along Vancouver, Washington's Waterfront Park, in the United States. The plaza features Jay Rood's 1992 sculpture Boat of Discovery. Made of metal, concrete, and brick, the artwork's dedication "coincided with the bicentennial celebration of the exploration and naming of the Columbia River in 1792". The site and sculpture, also known as the Captain George Vancouver Monument, have been included in walking tours of Vancouver.

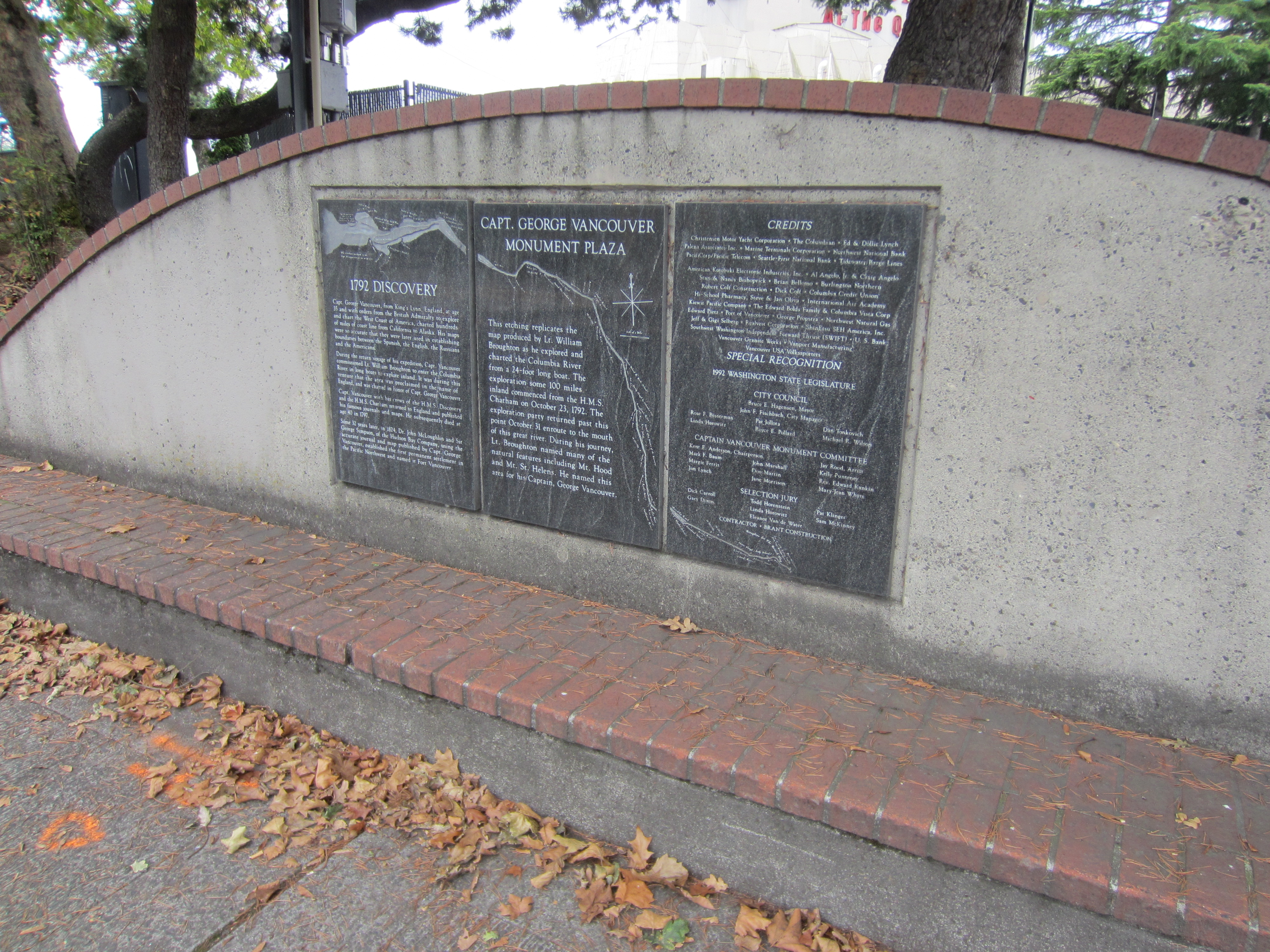

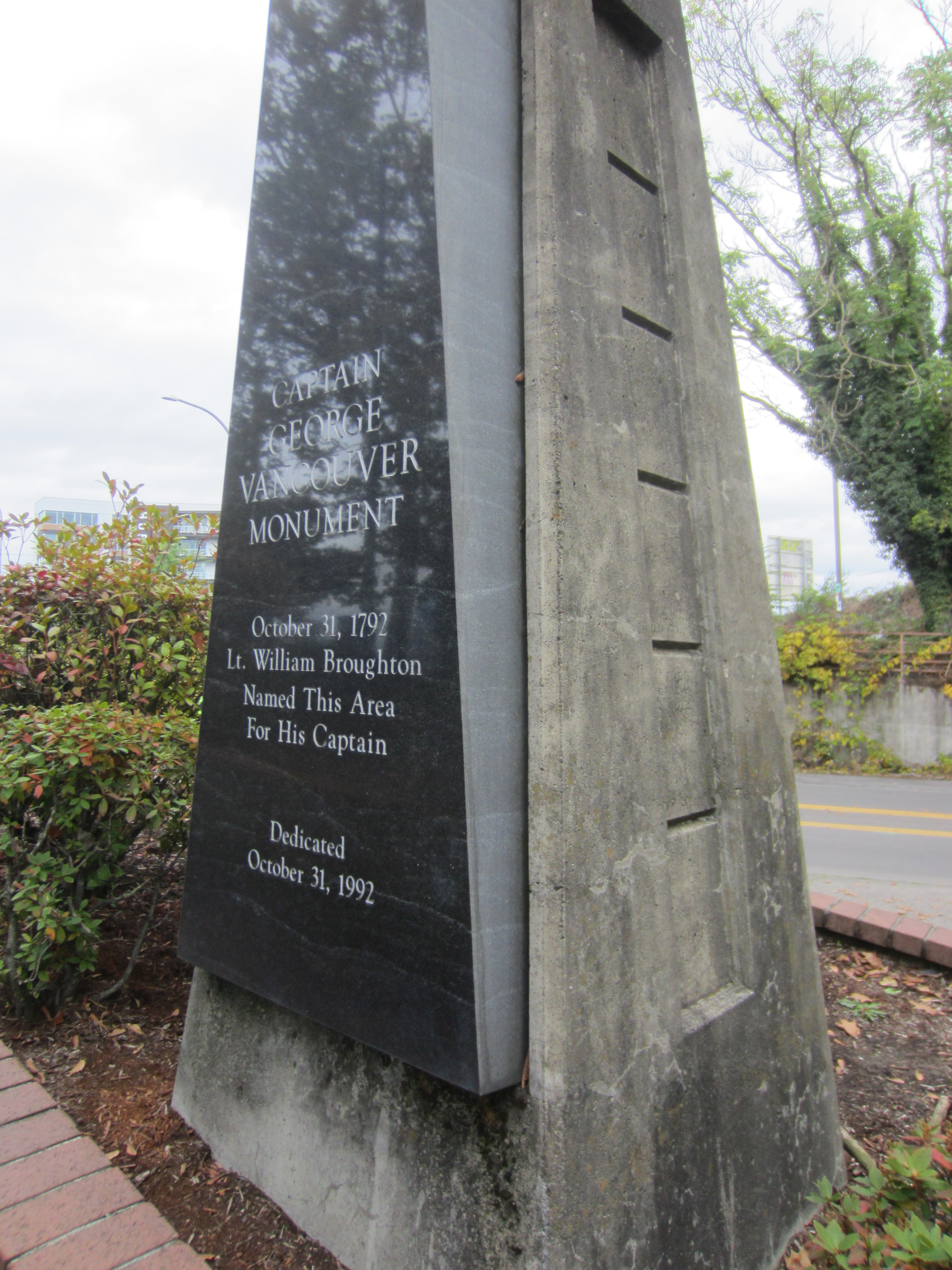

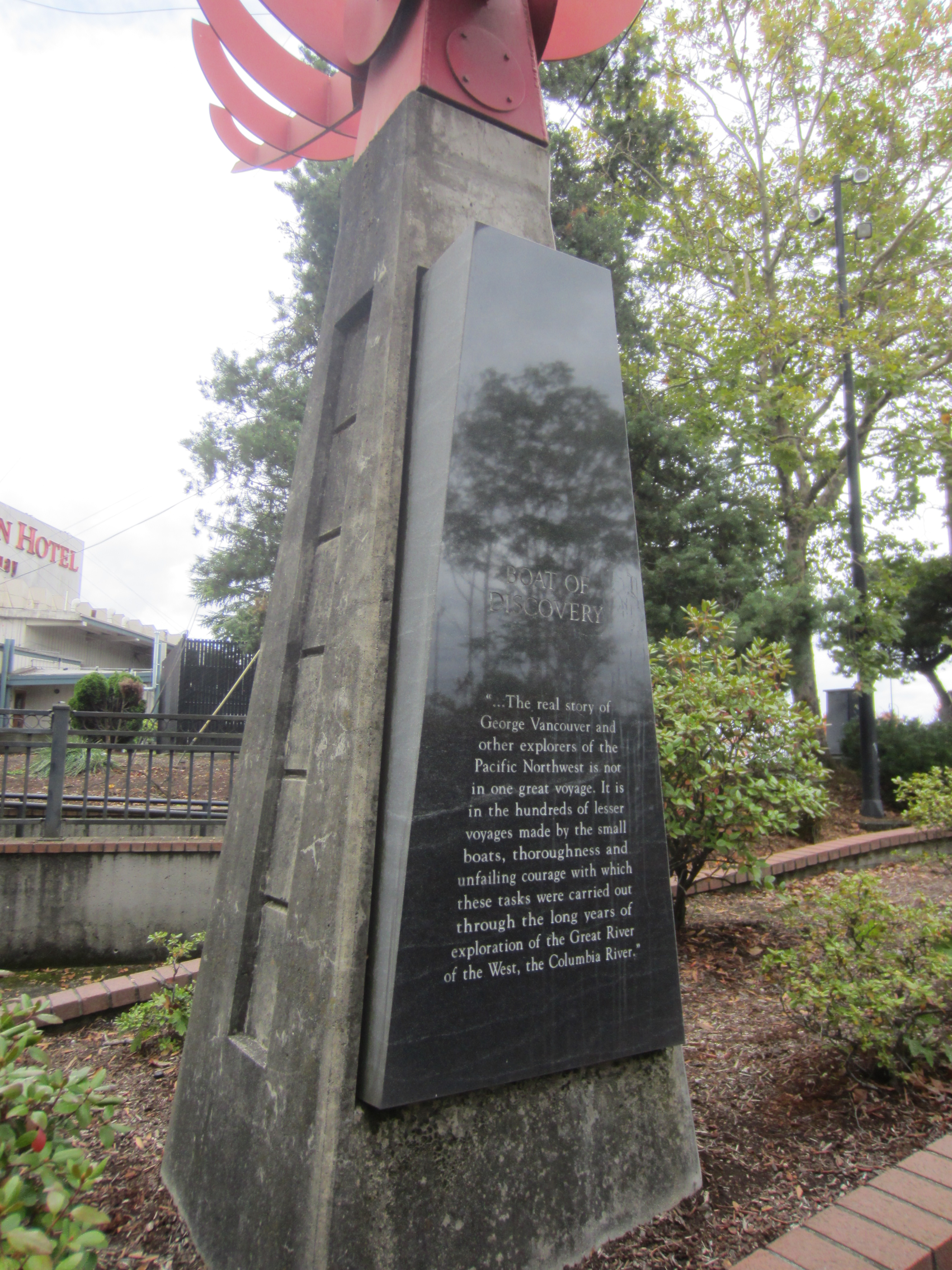

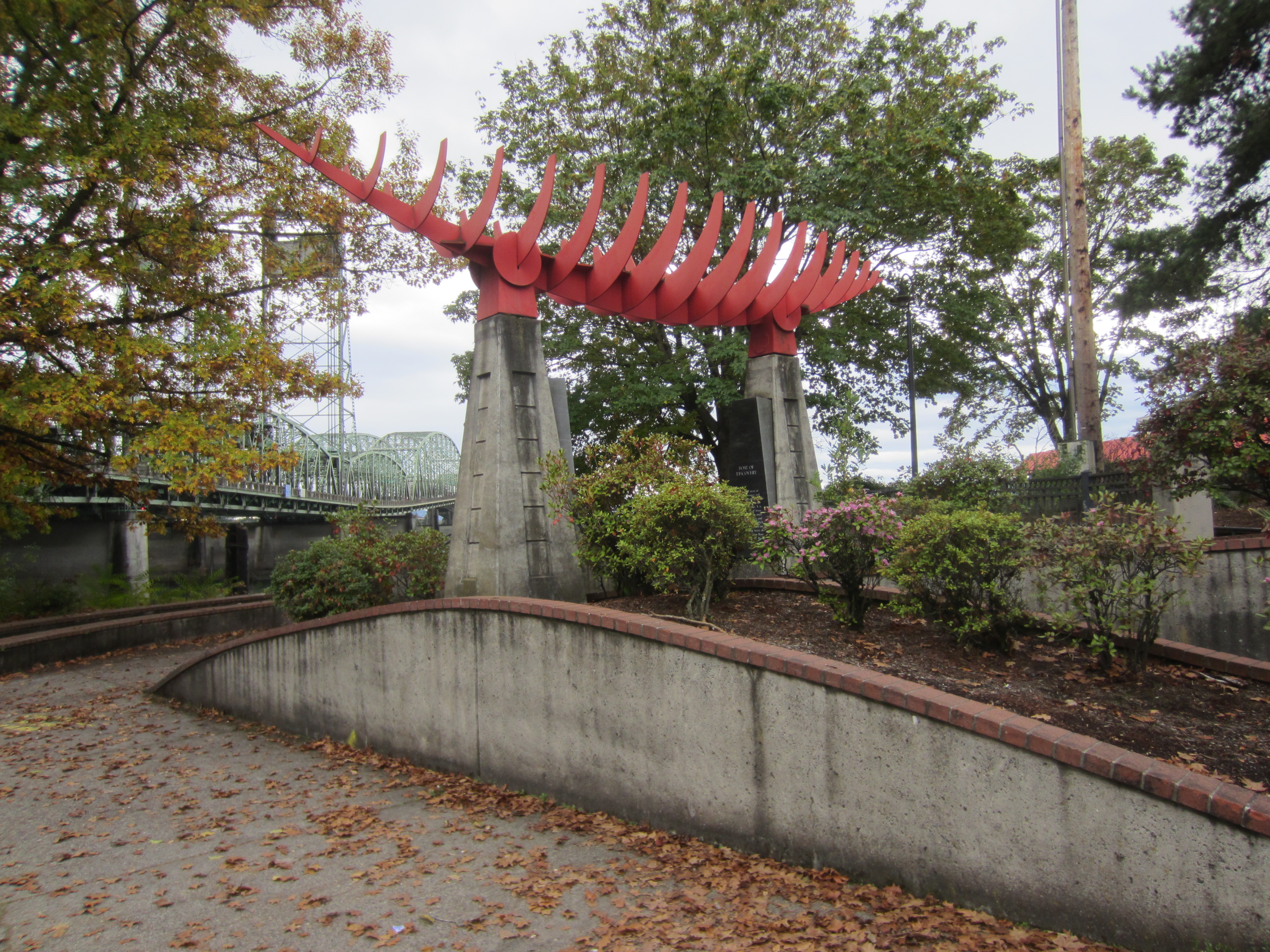

== See also ==
- List of public art in Vancouver, Washington
