= Ghost Forest =

Art installation by Maya Lin

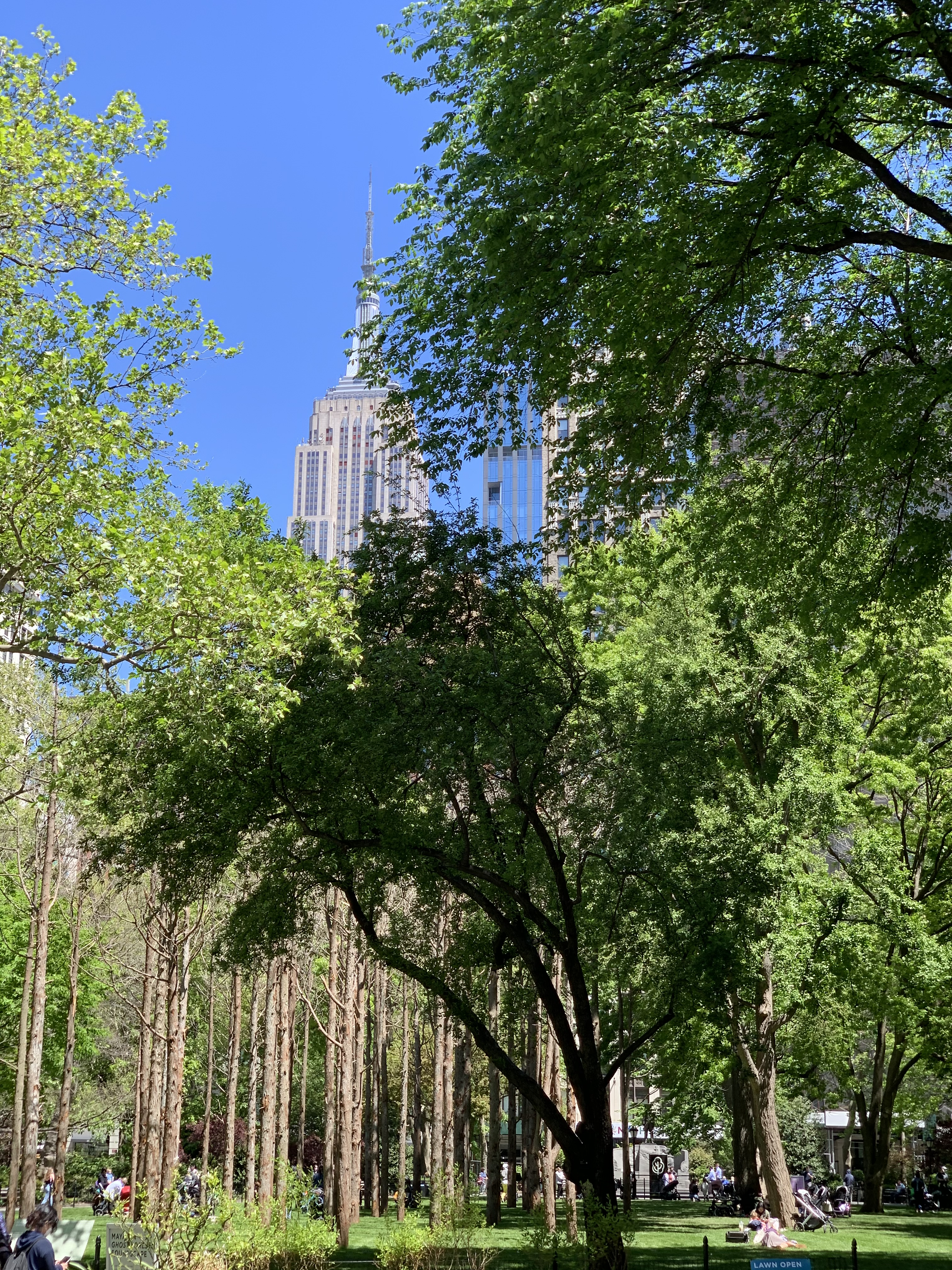
Ghost Forest by Maya Lin, on May 12, 2021

Ghost Forest is an art installation by Maya Lin in Madison Square Park in New York City. The piece is composed of 49 dead Atlantic white cedars.

== Overview ==
The installation ran from May 10, 2021, to November 14, 2021. The trees as installed were approximately 40 feet (12 m) tall and were all scheduled to be cut down as part of a restoration program in the New Jersey Pine Barrens.

The trees, after the installation had finished, were saw-milled into planks on November 19, 2021, and donated to Rocking the Boat, an educational non-profit in the Bronx, to be built into boats by students. A trustee for Rocking the Boat experienced the installation and inquired about using the trees after it was over. The Madison Square Park Conservancy and Lin agreed, with Lin saying:

The Atlantic white cedar trees have great resiliency. They were sourced from a dying forest. They stood in Madison Square Park as symbols and signposts for six months to demonstrate the physical materiality of climate change. And now they are being repurposed with new meaning.

The boats are planned to be finished and launched for the first time in mid-2023.
