= Marengo (surname) =

Marengo is an Italian surname. Notable people with the surname include:

- Giorgio Marengo (born 1974), Italian prelate of the Catholic Church
- Gisella Marengo (born 1975), Italian actress
- Jakob Marengo (1805–1875), Namibian chief leader in the insurrection against the German Empire
- Juan Tanca Marengo (1895–1965), Ecuadorian physician
- Kimon Evan Marengo (1904–1988), Egyptian-born British cartoonist
- Levi Marengo (born 1987), Dutch footballer
- Lina Marengo (1911–1987), Italian actress
- Ludcinio Marengo (born 1991), Dutch footballer
- Luigi Marengo (1928–2010), Italian painter
- Manuel Marengo (born 1973), Peruvian footballer
- Oreste Marengo (1906–1998), Italian Roman Catholic prelate and Salesians missionary in India
- Ricardo Rodríguez Marengo (born 1998), Argentine professional footballer
- Rocío Marengo (born 1980), Argentinian model, actress, and dancer
- Umberto Marengo (born 1992), Italian cyclist

== See also ==
- Marengo (disambiguation)
