= Vancouver Waterfront Park =

Park in Vancouver, Washington, U.S.

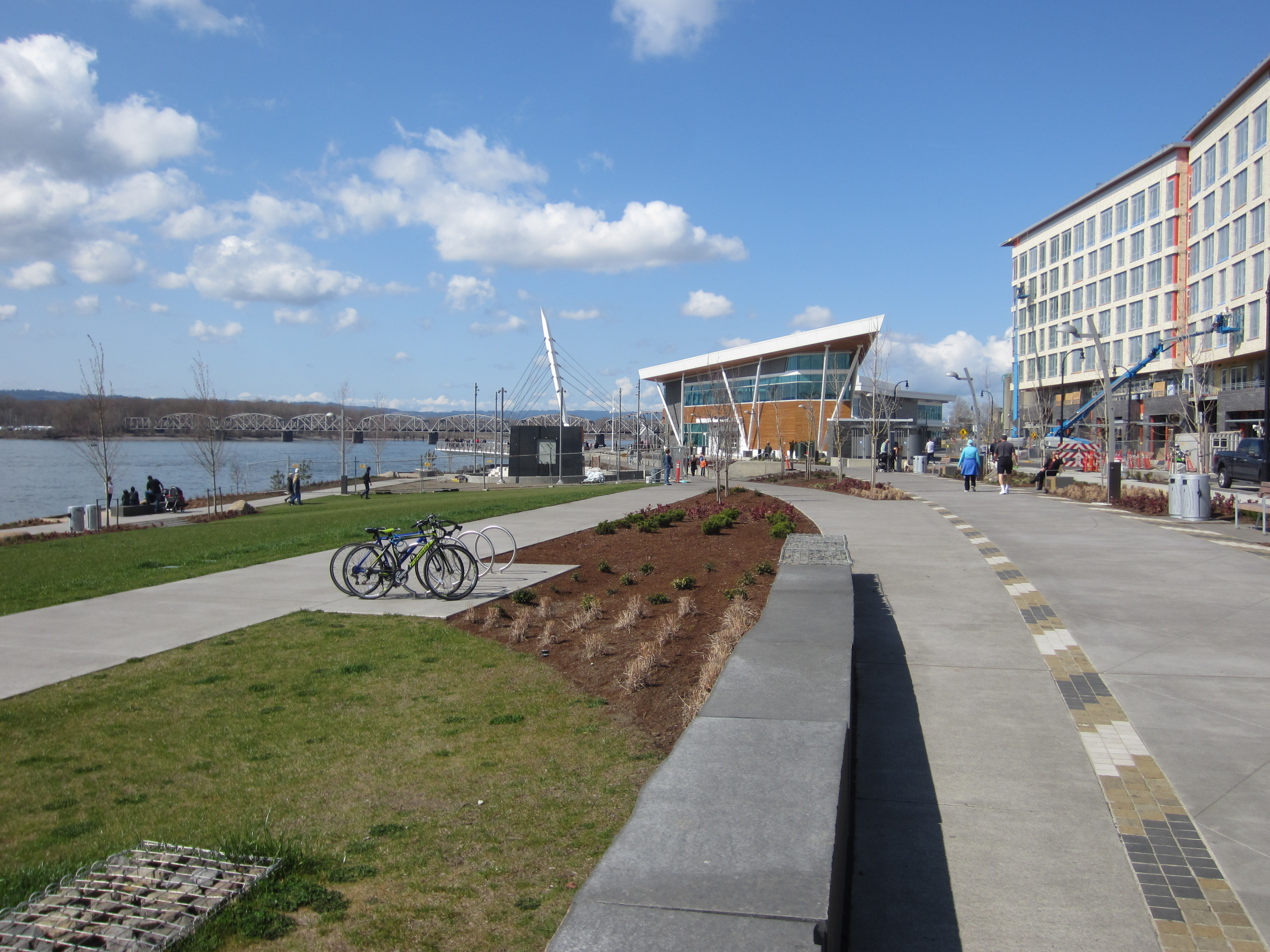
- The waterfront in 2019

- Location within Washington (state)
- Type: Urban park and pier
- Location: Vancouver, Washington
- Coordinates: 45°37′27″N 122°40′53″W
- Area: 7.3 acres (3.0 ha)
- Opening: September 29, 2018
- Status: Open

Vancouver Waterfront Park is a 7.3-acre (3.0 ha) waterfront park in Vancouver, Washington, in the United States.

== Description and history ==
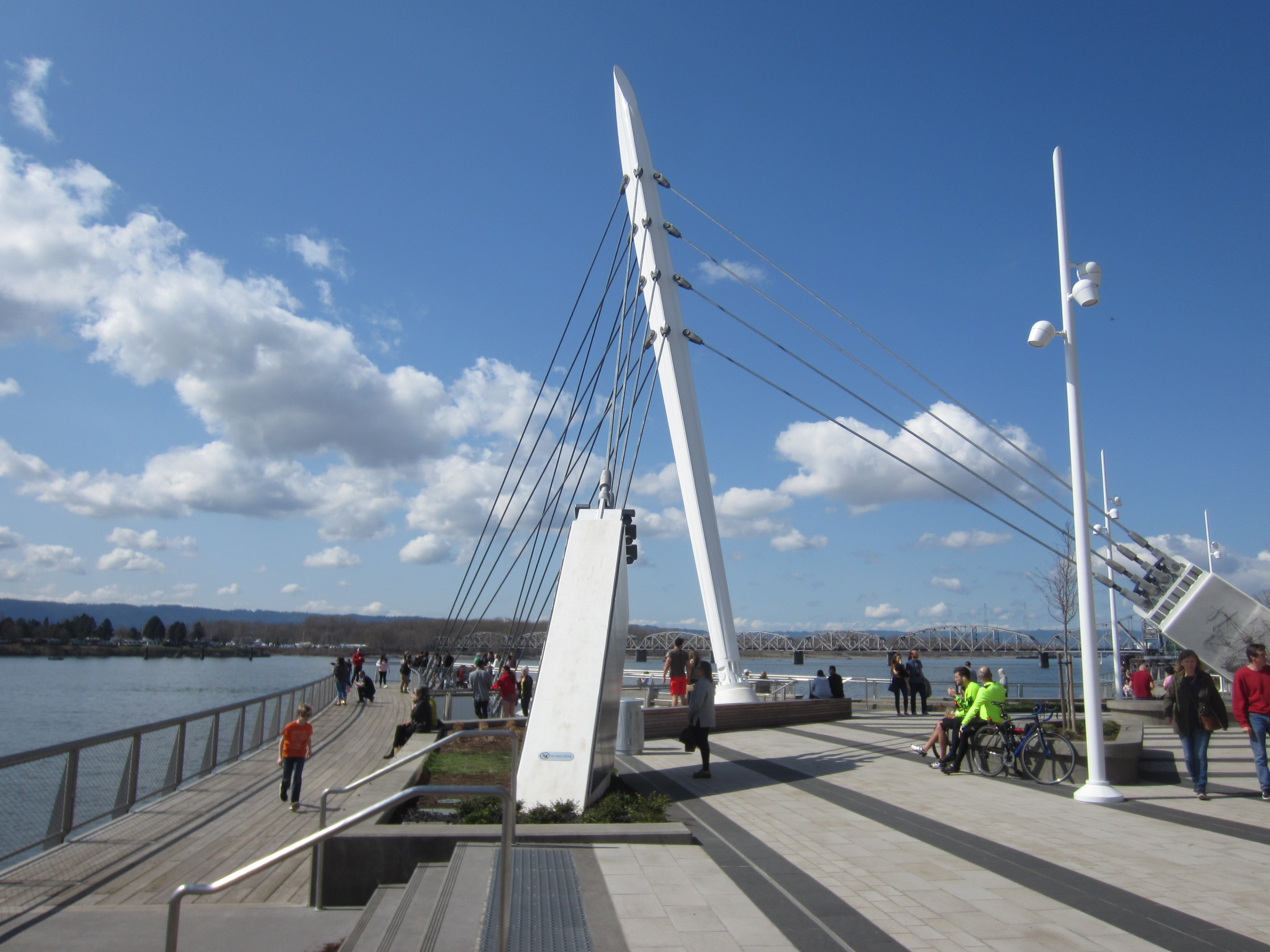
Grant Street Pier

The park is part of a 32-acre (13 ha), 21-block mixed-use urban redevelopment with office and retail spaces, and residential units. The site was originally home to a paper mill owned by Boise Cascade that closed in 2005. In 2006 real estate development company Gramor Development, Inc. owned by Barry Cain, formed a partnership with three local couples (Steve and Jan Oliva, Steve and Jo Marie Hansen and Al and Sandee Kirkwood) to acquire and develop the property. That partnership Columbia Waterfront LLC, acquired the property in February 2008. A master plan from the LLC was approved by the city government the following year. New street connections were built from the north in 2014 and 2015. About the same time Columbia Waterfront LLC donated the 7.3 acre park property to the City of Vancouver.

The M.J. Murdock Charitable Trust was announced as the first office tenant for the project in 2015. The $1.3 billion project, consisting of a city park and pier and five residential, office and retail buildings, began construction in 2016. The park opened September 29, 2018.

The city installed a pair of Portland Loo public toilets at the park in October 2018. The loos are especially designed to remain open 24/7. Slats allow a potential user to see if the toilet is already occupied, and if more than one individual is inside. They are large enough that a user can wheel in a child's stroller, shopping buggy, bicycle, or dog. The bathrooms installed in Vancouver are equipped with both a table for changing babies, and a bin for addicts to safely dispose of used needles.

== Public art ==
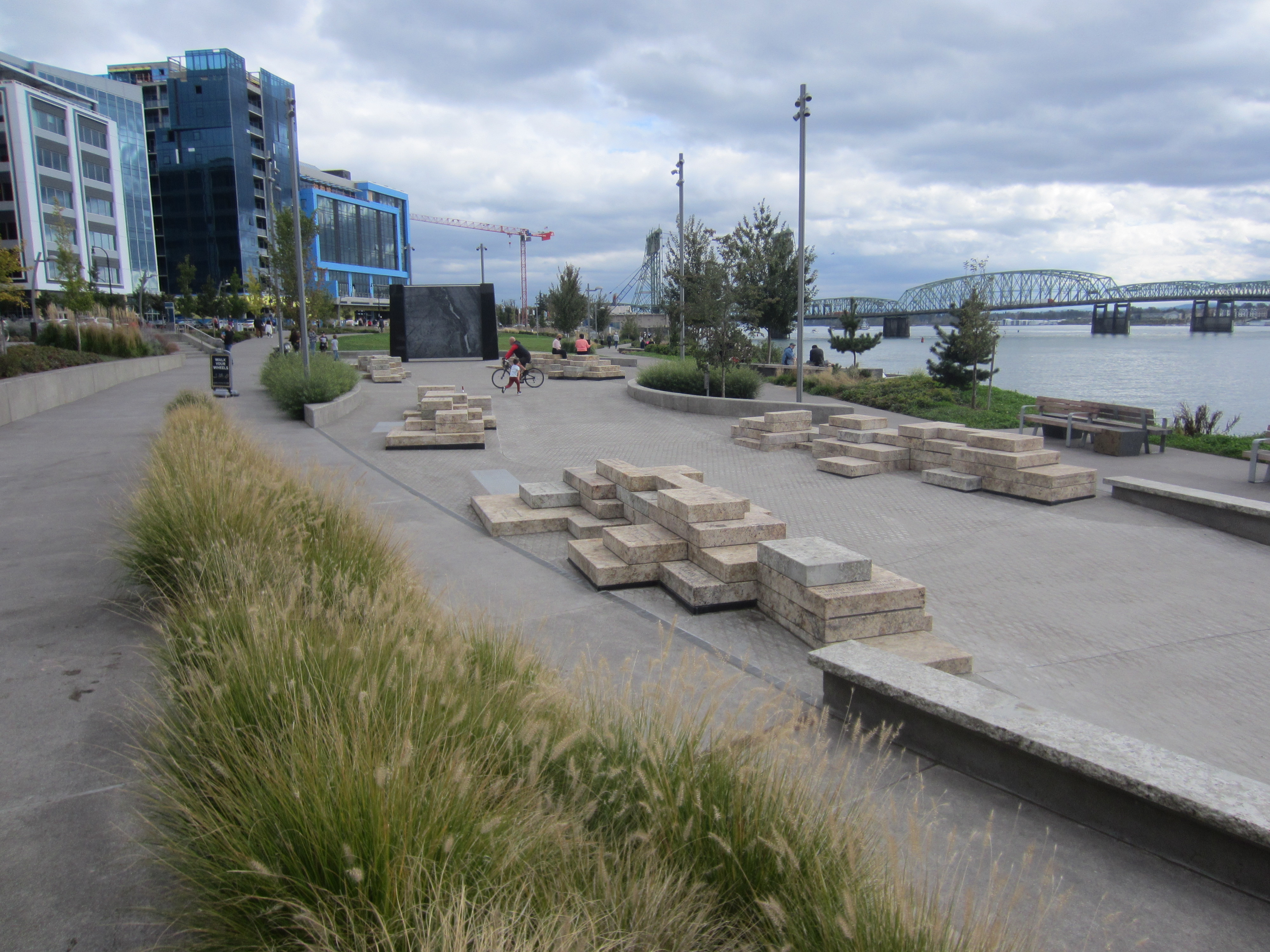
Headwaters, pictured in October 2020

A 12-foot (3.7 m) stone and bronze structure called Headwaters (or sometimes the Headwaters Wall) designed by artist Larry Kirkland was installed at Waterfront Park in August 2019. It is an interactive water feature that cost $3.5 million to construct. Headwaters features a cast bronze bas relief map of the Columbia Basin on the east side. The opposite side has an "engraved stone with a topographical map of the Columbia's origins", down which water falls into a shallow wading pool. According to KOIN, "one-inch-deep 'river' flows 150 feet along a molded riverbed dotted with stacks of granite representing each of the Columbia's tributaries". In September, The Columbian reported on the "unsightly" white deposits left by water. The water feature is maintained by the Vancouver Parks and Recreation Department.

== See also ==
- Captain George Vancouver Monument Plaza
- Vancouver Land Bridge
