= Marengo, Indiana =

- Town
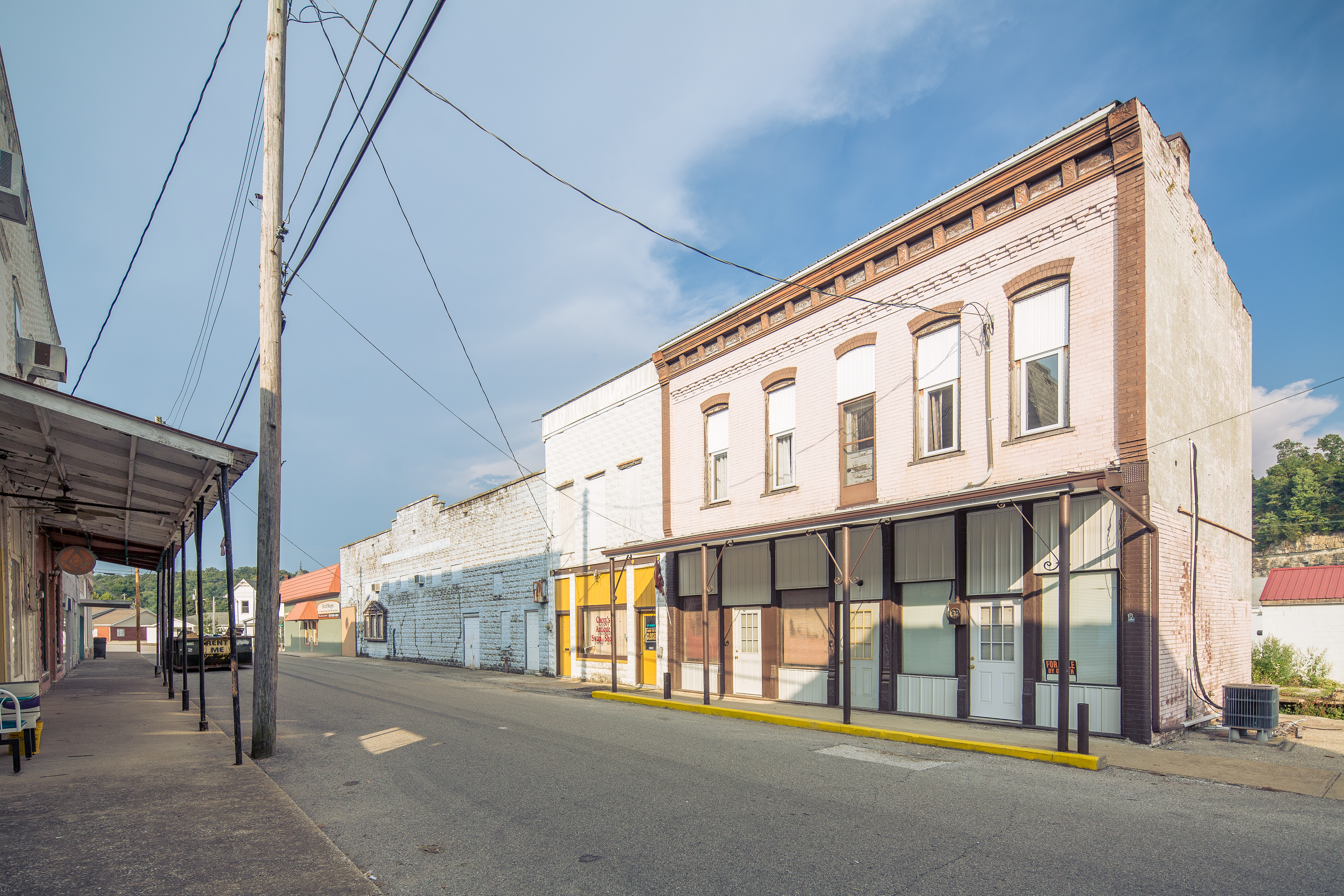

- Location of Marengo in Crawford County, Indiana.
- Coordinates: 38°22′24″N 86°20′39″W
- Country: United States
- State: Indiana
- County: Crawford
- Township: Liberty

Area
  - Total: 0.78 sq mi (2.01 km^{2})
  - Land: 0.78 sq mi (2.01 km^{2})
  - Water: 0 sq mi (0.00 km^{2})
- Elevation: 659 ft (201 m)

Population (2020)
  - Total: 829
  - Density: 1,070.5/sq mi (413.32/km^{2})
- Time zone: UTC-5 (Eastern (EST))
  - Summer (DST): UTC-4 (EDT)
- ZIP code: 47140
- Area code: 812
- FIPS code: 18-46746
- GNIS feature ID: 2396735
- Website: marengo-indiana.com

Marengo is a town in Liberty Township, Crawford County, Indiana, United States. The population was 829 at the 2020 census. One of the tourist attractions and sources of revenue for the town is Marengo Cave, a U.S. National Landmark.

== History ==
Marengo was originally called Big Springs, and under the latter name was platted in 1839.

The name Marengo commemorates the Battle of Marengo.

Marengo was devastated by an F3 tornado in 2004, resulting in damage to nearly 75 percent of the town and the death of one resident.

Marengo High School was located in Marengo until the consolidation of the schools into Crawford County High School.

== Geography ==
According to the 2010 census, Marengo has a total area of 0.77 square miles (1.99 km^{2}), all land.

== Demographics ==
Historical population
Census	Pop.	Note	%±
1890	669		—
1900	700		4.6%
1910	686		−2.0%
1920	747		8.9%
1930	806		7.9%
1940	812		0.7%
1950	801		−1.4%
1960	803		0.2%
1970	767		−4.5%
1980	892		16.3%
1990	856		−4.0%
2000	829		−3.2%
2010	828		−0.1%
2020	829		0.1%
U.S. Decennial Census

=== 2010 census ===
As of the census of 2010, there were 828 people, 354 households, and 213 families living in the town. The population density was 1,075.3 inhabitants per square mile (415.2/km^{2}). There were 408 housing units at an average density of 529.9 per square mile (204.6/km^{2}). The racial makeup of the town was 95.4% White, 0.1% African American, 0.8% Native American, 0.5% Pacific Islander, 0.5% from other races, and 2.7% from two or more races. Hispanic or Latino of any race were 2.1% of the population.

There were 354 households, of which 34.5% had children under the age of 18 living with them, 39.8% were married couples living together, 15.0% had a female householder with no husband present, 5.4% had a male householder with no wife present, and 39.8% were non-families. 36.7% of all households were made up of individuals, and 15.6% had someone living alone who was 65 years of age or older. The average household size was 2.34 and the average family size was 3.02.

The median age in the town was 36.2 years. 26.7% of residents were under the age of 18; 10.5% were between the ages of 18 and 24; 24% were from 25 to 44; 24% were from 45 to 64; and 14.5% were 65 years of age or older. The gender makeup of the town was 47.8% male and 52.2% female.

=== 2000 census ===
As of the census of 2000, there were 829 people, 363 households, and 218 families living in the town. The population density was 1,083.5 inhabitants per square mile (418.3/km^{2}). There were 403 housing units at an average density of 526.7 per square mile (203.4/km^{2}). The racial makeup of the town was 98.31% White, 0.24% Native American, 0.12% Asian, 0.12% Pacific Islander, 0.60% from other races, and 0.60% from two or more races. Hispanic or Latino of any race were 1.09% of the population.

There were 363 households, out of which 28.9% had children under the age of 18 living with them, 45.2% were married couples living together, 11.0% had a female householder with no husband present, and 39.9% were non-families. 35.0% of all households were made up of individuals, and 17.9% had someone living alone who was 65 years of age or older. The average household size was 2.28 and the average family size was 3.00.

In the town, the population was spread out, with 24.7% under the age of 18, 7.0% from 18 to 24, 28.6% from 25 to 44, 22.1% from 45 to 64, and 17.6% who were 65 years of age or older. The median age was 37 years. For every 100 females, there were 89.7 males. For every 100 females age 18 and over, there were 83.0 males.

The median income for a household in the town was $23,542, and the median income for a family was $32,019. Males had a median income of $27,109 versus $19,211 for females. The per capita income for the town was $11,194. About 13.6% of families and 23.9% of the population were below the poverty line, including 29.9% of those under age 18 and 26.1% of those age 65 or over.

== Trivia ==
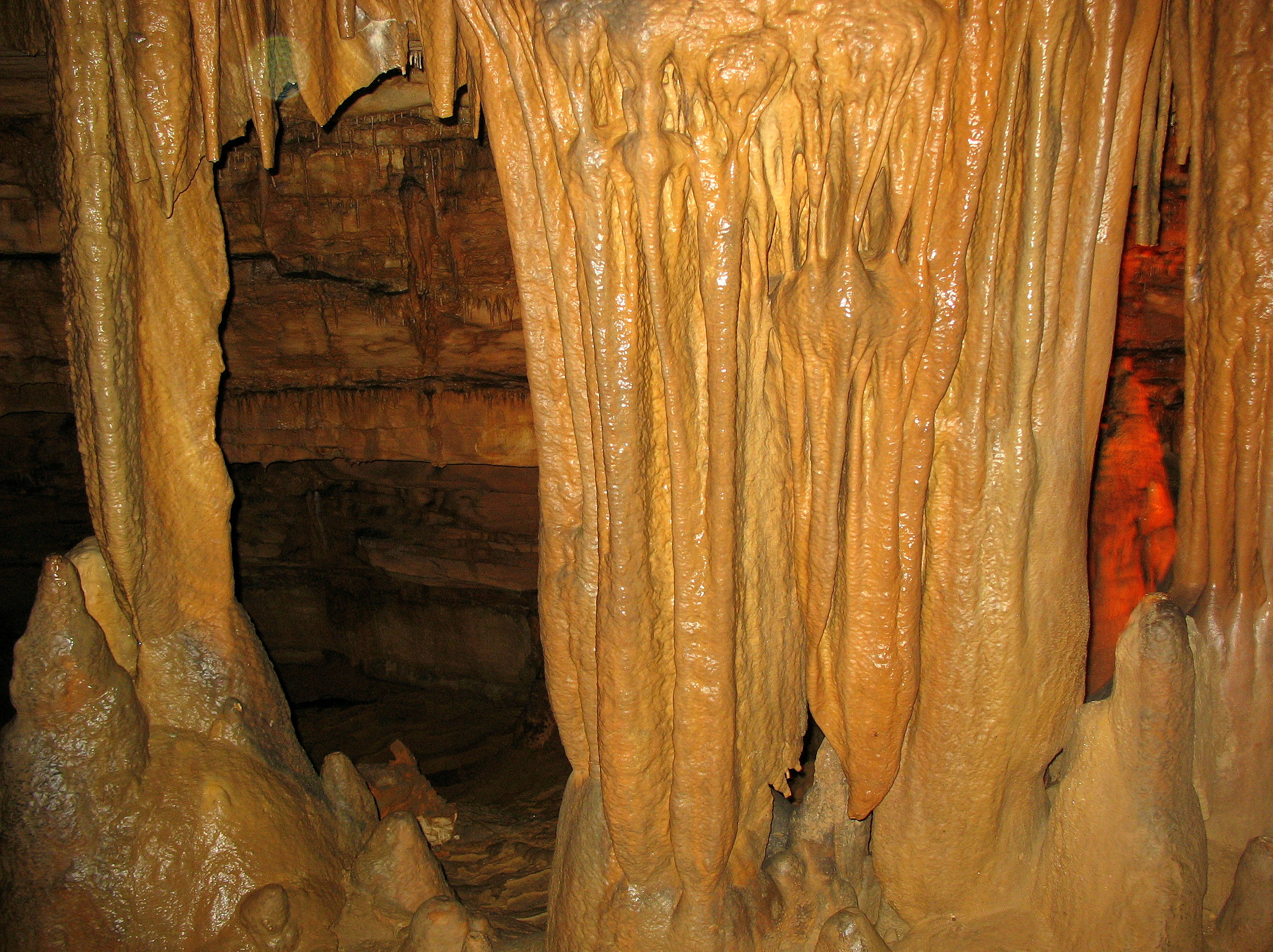
Formations seen during a tour of Marengo Cave.

- The movie Madison (2001), starring Jim Caviezel and Jake Lloyd, shot a scene in downtown Marengo.
- The movie Fire from Below (2008), starring Kevin Sorbo, filmed at Marengo Cave.
- The Marengo Warehouse and Distribution Center, an underground facility, has space leased by the United States Department of Defense as well as the Centers for Disease Control, whose contract specified that the contents of their space did not have to be revealed to the warehouse management.

== Points of interest ==
- Marengo Cave
- Patoka Lake
- Sycamore Springs
- Hoosier National Forest
- Hemlock Cliffs
- Wyandotte Caves

== Notable people ==
- William E. Jenner, U.S. senator from Indiana
