= Maya Lin =

American designer and artist (born 1959)

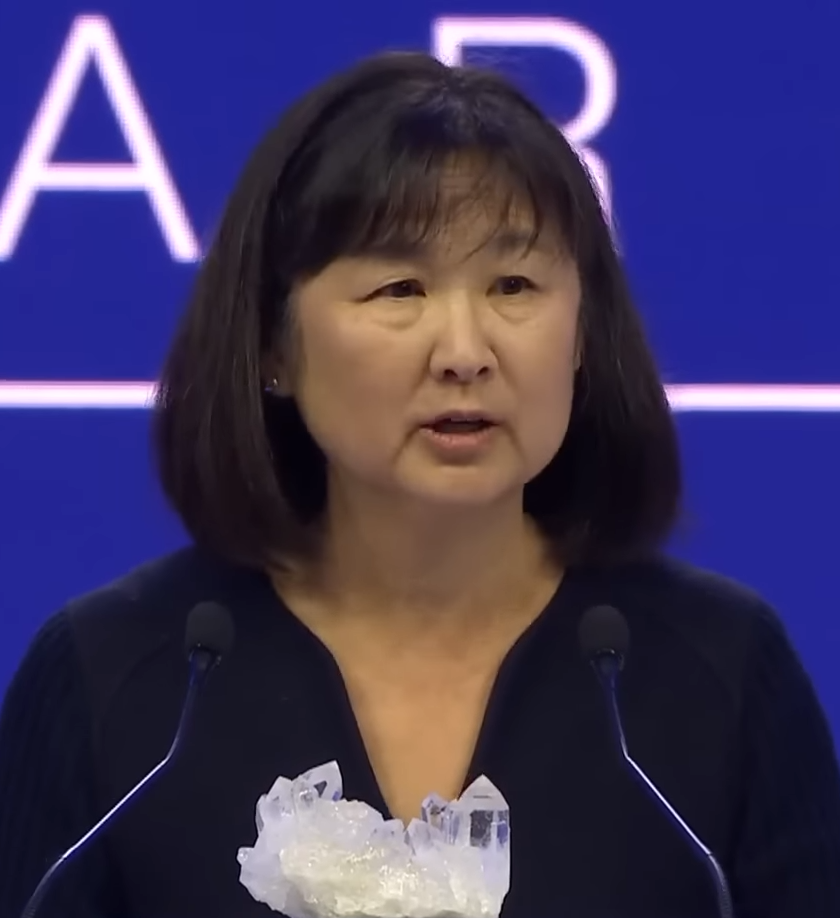
- Lin (2023; age 63)
- Born: Maya Ying Lin; October 5, 1959 (age 67); Athens, Ohio, U.S.
- Citizenship: American
- Education: Yale University (BA, MArch)
- Known for: Land art, architecture, memorials
- Notable work: Vietnam Veterans Memorial (1982); Civil Rights Memorial (1989)
- Spouse: Daniel Wolf (m. 1996; died 2021)
- Children: 2
- Awards: National Medal of Arts Presidential Medal of Freedom
- Website: mayalin.com

Maya Lin
- Traditional Chinese: 林瓔
- Simplified Chinese: 林璎
Transcriptions
Standard Mandarin
- Hanyu Pinyin: Lín Yīng

Maya Ying Lin (Chinese: 林瓔; pinyin: Lín Yīng; born October 5, 1959) is an American architect, designer, and sculptor. Born in Athens, Ohio, to Chinese immigrants, she attended Yale University to study architecture. She has an older brother, the poet Tan Lin.

In 1981, while still an undergraduate at Yale, Lin achieved national recognition when she won a national design competition for the planned Vietnam Veterans Memorial in Washington, D.C. The memorial was designed in the minimalist architectural style, and it attracted controversy upon its release but went on to become influential.

Lin has since designed numerous memorials, public and private buildings, landscapes, and sculptures. In 1989, she designed the Civil Rights Memorial in Montgomery, Alabama.

Although best-known for historical memorials, Lin is also known for environmentally themed works that often address environmental decline. According to Lin, she draws inspiration from the architecture of nature but believes that nothing she creates can match its beauty. She also draws inspirations from "culturally diverse sources, including Japanese gardens, Hopewell Indian earthen mounds and works by American earthworks artists of the 1960s and the 1970s".

== Early life and education ==
Maya Lin was born in Athens, Ohio. Her parents emigrated from China to the United States, her father in 1948 and her mother in 1949, and settled in Ohio before Lin was born. Her father, Henry Huan Lin, born in Fuzhou, Fujian, was a ceramist and dean of the Ohio University College of Fine Arts. Her mother, Julia Chang Lin, born in Shanghai, was a poet and professor of literature at Ohio University. She is the "half" niece of Lin Huiyin, who was an American-educated artist and poet, and said to have been the first female architect in modern China; Lin Chang-min, a Hanlin of Qing dynasty and the emperor's teacher, fathered Lin Huiyin with his wife, while Maya Lin's father Henry Huan Lin was Lin Chang-Min’s son by his concubine. Lin Juemin and Lin Yin Ming, both of whom were among the 72 martyrs of the Second Guangzhou uprising, were cousins of her grandfather.

According to Lin, she "didn't even realize" she was ethnically Chinese until later in life, and that only in her 30s did she acquire an interest in her cultural background.

Lin has said that she did not have many friends when growing up, stayed home a lot, loved to study, and loved school. While still in high school she took courses at Ohio University where she learned to cast bronze in the school's foundry. She graduated in 1977 from Athens High School in The Plains, Ohio, after which she attended Yale University where she earned a Bachelor of Arts in 1981 and a Master of Architecture in 1986.

== Environmental concerns ==
According to Lin, she has been concerned with environmental issues since she was very young, and dedicated much of her time at Yale University to environmental activism. She attributes her interest in the environment to her upbringing in rural Ohio: the nearby Hopewell and Adena Native America burial mounds inspired her from an early age. Noting that much of her later work has focused on the relationship people have with their environment, as expressed in her earthworks, sculptures, and installations, Lin said:

"I'm very much a product of the growing awareness about ecology and the environmental movement...I am very drawn to landscape, and my work is about finding a balance in the landscape, respecting nature not trying to dominate it. Even the Vietnam Veterans Memorial is an earthwork. All of my work is about slipping things in, inserting an order or a structuring, yet making an interface so that in the end, rather than a hierarchy, there is a balance and tension between the man-made and the natural."

According to the scholar Susette Min, Lin's work uncovers "hidden histories" to bring attention to landscapes and environments that would otherwise be inaccessible to viewers and "deploys the concept to discuss the inextricable relationship between nature and the built environment". Lin's focus on this relationship highlights the impact humanity has on the environment, and draws attention to issues such as global warming, endangered bodies of water, and animal extinction/endangerment. She has explored these issues in her recent memorial, called What Is Missing?

According to one commentator, Lin constructs her works to have a minimal effect on the environment by utilizing recycled and sustainable materials, by minimizing carbon emissions, and by attempting to avoid damaging the landscapes/ecosystems where she works.

In addition to her other activities as an environmentalist, Lin has served on the Natural Resources Defense Council board of trustees.

== Vietnam Veterans Memorial ==
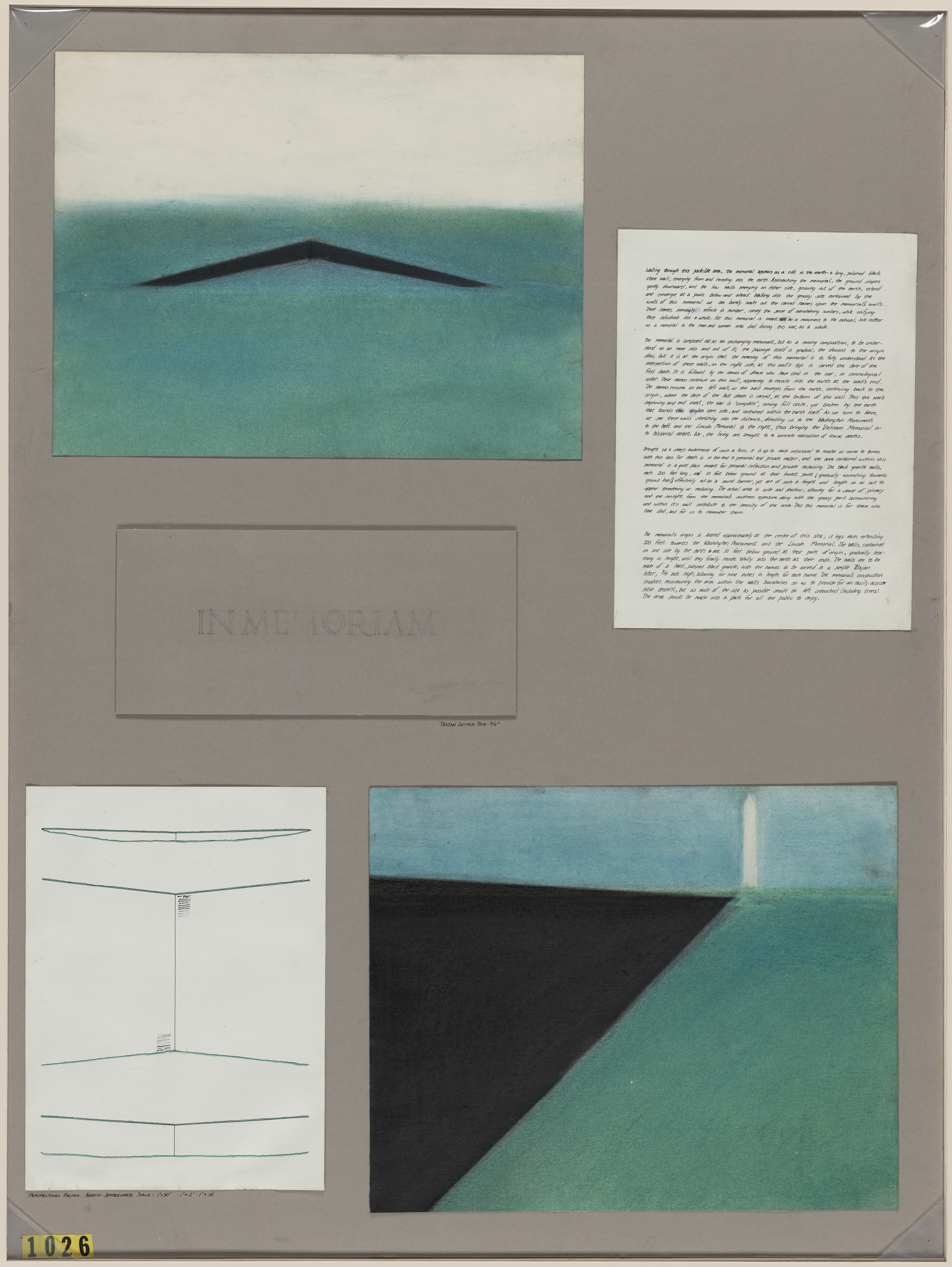
Lin's winning submission for the Vietnam Veterans Memorial design competition.

In 1981, at 21 and still an undergraduate student, Lin won a public design competition to design the Vietnam Veterans Memorial to be built on the National Mall in Washington D.C. Her design, one of 1,422 submissions, specified a black granite wall with the names of 57,939 fallen soldiers carved into its face (hundreds more have been added since the dedication), to be v-shaped, with one side pointing toward the Lincoln Memorial and the other toward the Washington Monument. The memorial was designed in the minimalist architectural style, which was in contrast to previous war memorials. The memorial was completed in late October 1982 and dedicated in November 1982.

According to Lin, her intention was to create an opening or a wound in the earth to symbolize the pain caused by the war and its many casualties. "I imagined taking a knife and cutting into the earth, opening it up and with the passage of time, that initial violence and pain would heal," she recalled.

Lin's winning design was initially controversial for several reasons: its minimalist design, her lack of professional experience, and her Asian ethnicity. Some objected to the exclusion of the surviving veterans' names, while others complained about the dark complexion of the granite, claiming it expressed a negative attitude towards the Vietnam War. Lin defended her design before the US Congress, and a compromise was reached: Three Soldiers, a bronze depiction of a group of soldiers and an American flag were placed to the side of Lin's design.

Notwithstanding the initial controversy, the memorial has become an important pilgrimage site for relatives and friends of the dead soldiers, many of whom leave personal tokens and mementos in memory of their loved ones. In 2007, an American Institute of Architects poll ranked the memorial No. 10 on a list of America's Favorite Architecture and is now one of the most visited sites on the National Mall. Furthermore, it now serves as a memorial for the veterans of the Afghanistan and Iraq wars. There is a collection with items left since 2001 from the Vietnam Veterans Memorial Fund, which includes handwritten letters and notes of those who lost loved ones during these wars. There is also a pair of combat boots and a note with it dedicated to the veterans of the Vietnam War, that reads "If your generation of Marines had not come home to jeers, insults and protests, my generation would not come home to thanks, handshakes and hugs."

Lin once said that if the competition had not been held "blind" (with designs submitted by number instead of name), she "never would have won" on account of her ethnicity. Her assertion is supported by the fact that she was harassed after her ethnicity was revealed; for example, prominent businessman and later third-party presidential candidate Ross Perot reportedly called her "Eggroll" in private.

== Later work ==
2 × 4 Landscape (2006) at the De Young Museum in San Francisco (January 2009).

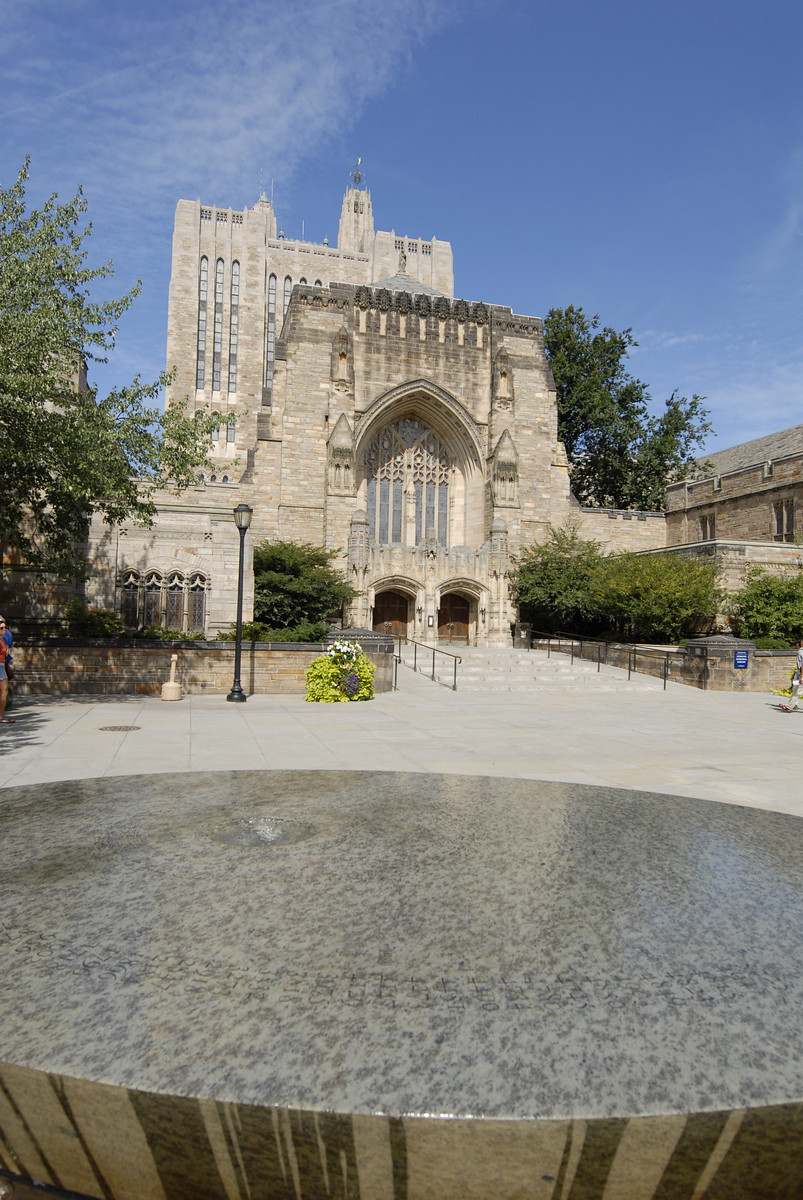
Lin's The Women's Table in front of the Sterling Memorial Library, commemorating the role of women at Yale University.

Lin, who now owns and operates Maya Lin Studio in New York City, has designed numerous projects following the Vietnam Veterans Memorial, including the Civil Rights Memorial in Montgomery, Alabama (1989) and the Wave Field outdoor installation at the University of Michigan (1995). Lin is represented by the Pace Gallery in New York City.

=== Works ===
- Peace-Chapel (completed in 1989), for the Baker Institute for Peace and Conflict Studies and Juniata College. Lin was approached by Elizabeth Evans Baker to design the open-aired chapel, perched on top of a mountain, and set within a 14-acre (5.7-hectare) site. The chapel represented in one place the connections between peace, art, spirituality, and nature. The site consists of a circle of stones for "pews", the ground of the earth for a floor, and the boundless sky for a ceiling overhead. The chapel is located within the 170-acre (69-hectare) Baker-Henry Nature Preserve in Huntingdon, PA.
- Wave Field (completed in 1995), for the University of Michigan. Lin was inspired by both diagrams of fluids in motion and photographs of ocean waves. She was intrigued by the idea of capturing and freezing the motion of water and wished to capture that movement in the earth rather than through photography. Wave Field was her first experiment with earthworks.
- Confluence Project (completed in 2000), a series of outdoor installations at historical points along the Columbia River and Snake River in the states of Washington and Oregon.
- Eleven Minute Line (completed in 2004), an earthwork in Sweden that was designed for the Wanås Foundation. Lin drew inspiration from the Serpent Mounds (Native American burial mounds) located in her home state, Ohio. It is meant to be a walkway for the viewers to experience, taking eleven minutes to complete. The work was inspired by Robert Smithson's Spiral Jetty.
- A new plaza (completed in 2005), at the Claire Trevor School of the Arts at the University of California, Irvine.
- Waterline (completed in 2006), composed of aluminum tubing and paint. Lin has described the piece as a drawing instead of a sculpture. It is a to-scale representation of the Mid-Atlantic ridge, and it is installed so that viewers may walk on the underwater mountain range. One critic saw in the work a purposeful ambiguity as to where the actual water line was in relation to the mountain range, which highlighted the viewers' relationship to the environment and the effect they had on bodies of water.
- Bodies of Water series (completed in 2006), consisting of representations of three bodies of water: "The Black Sea"; "The Caspian Sea"; and "The Red Sea". Each sculpture is made of layers of birch plywood, and are to-scale representations of three endangered bodies of water. The sculptures are balanced on the deepest point of the sea. Lin wished to call attention to the "unseen ecosystems" that people continue to pollute.
- Input (with her brother, poet Tan Lin, completed in 2004). Lin was commissioned by Ohio University to design what is known as Input in that institution's Bicentennial Park, a landscape designed to resemble a computer punch card. The work relates to Lin's first official connection with the university. The daughter of the late Professor Emerita of English Julia Lin and the late Henry Lin, dean emeritus of the College of Fine Arts, Maya Lin studied computer programming at the university while in high school. The installation is located in a 3.5-acre (1.4-hectare) park. It has 21 rectangles, some raised and some depressed, resembling the holes in computer punch cards, a mainstay of early programming courses.
- Above and Below (completed in 2007), an outdoor sculpture at the Indianapolis Museum of Art in Indiana. The artwork is made of aluminum tubing that has been electrolytically colored by anodization.
- 2 × 4 Landscape (completed in 2008), a 30-short-ton (27 t) sculpture made of many pieces of wood, which was exhibited at the M.H. de Young Memorial Museum, in San Francisco. The sculpture itself is evocative of the swelling movement of water, which is juxtaposed with the dry materiality of the lumber pieces. According to Lin, 2 × 4 Landscape was her attempt to bring the experience of Wavefield (1995) indoors. The 2-by-4-inch (5 cm × 10 cm) pieces are also meant to be reminiscent of pixels, to evoke the "virtual or digital space that we are increasingly occupying".
- Wave Field (completed in 2008), at the Storm King Art Center in New York state. It is the center's first earthwork, spanning 4 acres (1.6 hectares) of land, and is a larger version of her original Wave Field (1995) that focuses on the "fusion of opposites", comparing the motion of water to the material of the earth.
- Design of a building (2009) for the Museum of Chinese in America, near New York City's Chinatown. Lin said that she found the project to be personally significant, explaining that she wants her two daughters to "know that part of their heritage".
- Silver River (2009), her first work of art in the Las Vegas Strip. It is part of a public fine art collection at MGM Mirage's CityCenter, which opened in December 2009. Lin created an 84-foot (26 m) cast of the Colorado River made entirely of reclaimed silver. With the sculpture, Lin wanted to make a statement about water conservation and the importance of the Colorado River to Nevada in terms of energy and water. The sculpture is displayed behind the front desk of the Aria Resort and Casino.
- Pin River - Sandy (completed in 2013) was a work Lin created in the aftermath of Hurricane Sandy. Displayed in the Pace Gallery of New York, it stands at 114 by 120 by 1 1/2 inches (290 cm × 305 cm × 4 cm). The work was meant to represent the flood zone of Hurricane Sandy. She wanted this piece to raise awareness of how New York City used to be, and how the natural oyster beds and salt marshes would protect from the storm surges.
- A Fold in the Field (completed in 2013). Her largest work to date, it was built from 105,000 cubic meters (3,700,000 cu ft) of earth fill, covering 3 hectares (7.4 acres). It forms part of a private collection within a sculpture park, owned by Alan Gibbs, north of Auckland, New Zealand.
- Since around 2010, Lin has been working on what she calls "her final memorial", the What Is Missing? Foundation, to commemorate the biodiversity that has been lost in the planet's sixth mass extinction. She aims to raise awareness about the loss of biodiversity and natural habitats by using sound, media, science, and art for temporary installations and a web-based project. What Is Missing? exists not in one specific site but in many forms and in many places simultaneously.
- From 2015 to 2021, Lin worked on the renovation and reconfiguration of the Neilson Library and its grounds at Smith College. A project in Madison Square Park, "Ghost Forest", was postponed until 2021, when it was manifest.
- Lin was commissioned to design a sculptural fountain for the Obama Presidential Center in Chicago,Illinois Seeing Through the Universe, which premiered with the opening of the complex in 2026.
- Also in 2026, Lin's A Parallel Nature consisting of two 54' high stone walls, in New York City was unveileed. It was commissioned by Chase Manhattan for their new skyscraper / corporate hesdquarters designed by Lord norman foster at 270 Park Avenue.

=== The White House ===
On February 25, 2010, the Obama administration awarded Lin the 2009 National Medal of Arts.

Both What is Missing and the Vietnam Veterans Memorial were referenced by the Obama administration in its press release that announced Lin as one of the 2016 recipients of the Presidential Medal of Freedom. Nature and the environment have been central concerns for Lin in both her art and architecture.

When informed of her win, Lin noted:

"As an artist I often work in series, and so for me, I wanted my last memorial to be on a subject that I have personally been concerned with and connected to since I was a child. The last memorial is 'What Is Missing?' and encompasses multiple platforms, with temporary and permanent physical installations as well as an interactive online component."

At the same time, Lin also expressed her concerns for the goals of the upcoming Trump administration:

"I think nature is resilient— if we protect it—and with my background I wanted to lend a voice to the incredible threat we are under from climate change and species and habitat loss."

=== Exhibitions ===
- Il Cortile Mare (1998-1999), an exhibition of furniture design, maquettes, and photos of works at the American Academy in Rome.
- Maya Lin: Systematic Landscapes (2008-2009), an exhibition of Lin's sculptures, drawings, and installations at the de Young Museum, San Francisco.

=== Written works ===
- Maya Lin, Boundaries (New York: Simon & Schuster, 2000).

== Design methodology ==
Maya Lin prefers the title of a designer rather than an architect. Her vision and focus are always on how space needs to be in the future, the balance and relationship with the nature. She focus less on politics influencing the design and more on what emotions the space would create and what it would show to the user. Her belief in a space being connected and the transition from inside to outside being fluid, coupled with what a space means, has led her to create designs regarding it. She has also worked on sculptures and landscape installations, such as “Input” artwork at Ohio University. In doing so, Lin focuses on remembering concepts of time periods instead of direct representations of figures, creating an abstract sculptures and installations.

Lin believes that art should be an act of any individual who is willing to say something that is new and not quite familiar. In her own words, Lin's work "originates from a simple desire to make people aware of their surroundings, not just the physical world but also the psychological world we live in." Lin describes her creative process as having a very important writing and verbal component. She first imagines an artwork verbally to understand its concepts and meanings. She believes that gathering ideas and information is especially vital in architecture, which focuses on humanity and life and requires a well-rounded mind. When a project comes her way, she tries to "understand the definition (of the site) in a verbal before finding the form to understand what a piece is conceptually and what its nature should be even before visiting the site". After she completely understands the definition of the site, Lin finalizes her designs by creating numerous renditions of her project in model form. In her historical memorials, such as the Vietnam Veterans Memorial, the Women's Table, and the Civil Rights Memorial, Lin tries to focus on the chronological aspect of what she is memorializing. That theme is shown in her art memorializing the changing environment and in charting the depletion of bodies of water. Lin also explores themes of juxtaposing materials and a fusion of opposites: "I feel I exist on the boundaries. Somewhere between science and art, art and architecture, public and private, east and west.... I am always trying to find a balance between these opposing forces, finding the place where opposites meet... existing not on either side but on the line that divides."

== Personal life ==
Lin was married to Daniel Wolf (1955–2021), a photography dealer and collector, until his death. Her sister-in-law was the philanthropist Diane R. Wolf (1954–2008). She has homes in New York and rural Colorado, and is the mother of two daughters, India and Rachel.

Lin has an older brother, the poet Tan Lin.

== Recognition ==
Lin has been awarded honorary doctorate degrees from Yale University, Harvard University, the University of Pennsylvania, Williams College, and Smith College. In 1987, she was among the youngest to be awarded an honorary Doctorate of Fine Arts by Yale University.

In 1994, she was the subject of the Academy Award-winning documentary Maya Lin: A Strong Clear Vision. Its title comes from an address she gave at Juniata College in which she spoke of the monument design process in the origin of her work; "My work originates from a simple desire to make people aware of their surroundings and this can include not just the physical but the psychological world that we live in."

In 2002, Lin was elected Alumni Fellow of the Yale Corporation, the governing body of Yale University (upon whose campus sits another of Lin's designs, the Women's Table, designed to commemorate the role of women at Yale University), in an unusually public contest. Her opponent was W. David Lee, a local New Haven minister and graduate of the Yale Divinity School, who was running on a platform to build ties to the community with the support of Yale's unionized employees. Lin was supported by Yale President Richard Levin and other members of the Yale Corporation, and she was the officially endorsed candidate of the Association of Yale Alumni.

In 2003, Lin was chosen to serve on the selection jury of the World Trade Center Site Memorial Competition. A trend toward minimalism and abstraction was noted among the entrants and the finalists as well as in the chosen design for the World Trade Center Memorial.

In 2005, Lin was elected to the American Academy of Arts and Letters, as well as the National Women's Hall of Fame in Seneca Falls, New York.

President Barack Obama awarded Lin the National Medal of Arts in 2009 and the Presidential Medal of Freedom in 2016.

In 2022, the Smithsonian's National Portrait Gallery in Washington, D.C. announced the first biographical exhibition, "One Life: Maya Lin", dedicated to Lin, noting her contributions as architect, sculptor, environmentalist, and designer of the Vietnam Veterans Memorial.

== Awards and honors ==
- 1999: Rome Prize
- 2000: Golden Plate Award of the American Academy of Achievement
- 2003: Finn Juhl Prize
- 2005: Elected to The American Academy of Arts and Letters
- 2005: Elected to National Women's Hall of Fame in Seneca Falls, New York
- 2007: AIA Twenty-five Year Award
- 2009: National Medal of Arts
- 2011: Thomas Jefferson Medal in Architecture, awarded jointly by the Thomas Jefferson Foundation and the University of Virginia
- 2014: The Dorothy and Lillian Gish Prize, a $300,000 art prize
- 2016: Presidential Medal of Freedom
- 2024: Received honorary Doctor of Arts from University of Pennsylvania
- 2024: Received honorary degree from Johns Hopkins University

== Selected works ==
- Vietnam Veterans Memorial (VVM) (1980–82), Washington, D.C.
- Aligning Reeds (1985), New Haven, Connecticut
- Civil Rights Memorial (1988–89), Montgomery, Alabama
- Open-Air Peace Chapel (1988–89), Juniata College, Huntingdon, Pennsylvania
- Topo (1989–91), Charlotte Sports Coliseum, Charlotte, North Carolina
- Eclipsed Time (1989–95), Pennsylvania Station, New York City
- The Women's Table (1990–93), Yale University, New Haven, Connecticut
- Weber House (1991–93), Williamstown, Massachusetts
- Groundswell (1992–93), Wexner Center for the Arts, Columbus, Ohio
- Museum for African Art (1992–93), New York City
- Wave Field (1993–95), FXB Aerospace Engineering Building, University of Michigan, Ann Arbor, Michigan
- 10 Degrees North (1993–96), Rockefeller Foundation Headquarters, New York City
- A Shift in the Stream (1995–97), Principal Financial Group Headquarters, Des Moines, Iowa
- Reading a Garden (1996–98), Cleveland Public Library, Cleveland, Ohio
- Private Duplex Apartment, New York City (1996–98), New York
- Topographic Landscape (1997) (Portable sculpture)
- Phases of the Moon (1998) (Portable sculpture)
- Avalanche (1998) (Portable sculpture)
- Langston Hughes Library (1999), Clinton, Tennessee
- Timetable (2000), Stanford University, Stanford, California
- The character of a hill, under glass (2000–01), American Express Client Services Center, Minneapolis, Minnesota
- Ecliptic (2001), Grand Rapids, Michigan
- Input (2004), Bicentennial Park, Athens, Ohio
- Riggio-Lynch Chapel (2004), Clinton, Tennessee
- Arts Plaza, Claire Trevor School of the Arts (2005), Irvine, California
- Confluence Project: Cape Disappointment State Park (2006)
- Above and Below, Indianapolis Museum of Art (2007)
- Confluence Project: Vancouver Land Bridge (2008)
- Confluence Project: Sandy River Delta (2008)
- Confluence Project: Sacajawea State Park (2010)
- Ellen S. Clark Hope Plaza, Washington University in St. Louis (2010)
- Confluence Project: Chief Timothy Park (2011)
- A Fold in the Field (2013), The Gibbs Farm, Kaipara Harbour, New Zealand
- "What is Missing? (2009–present), (Various locations, web project)
- Under the Laurentide, Brown University (2015)
- Folding the Chesapeake (part of Wonder exhibit): Renwick Gallery, Washington, DC (2015)
- Neilson Library (2021), Smith College, Northampton, Massachusetts (redesign)
- Ghost Forest (2021), Madison Square Park, New York, New York
