= Marengo Cave =

Privately owned cave in Marengo, Indiana, US

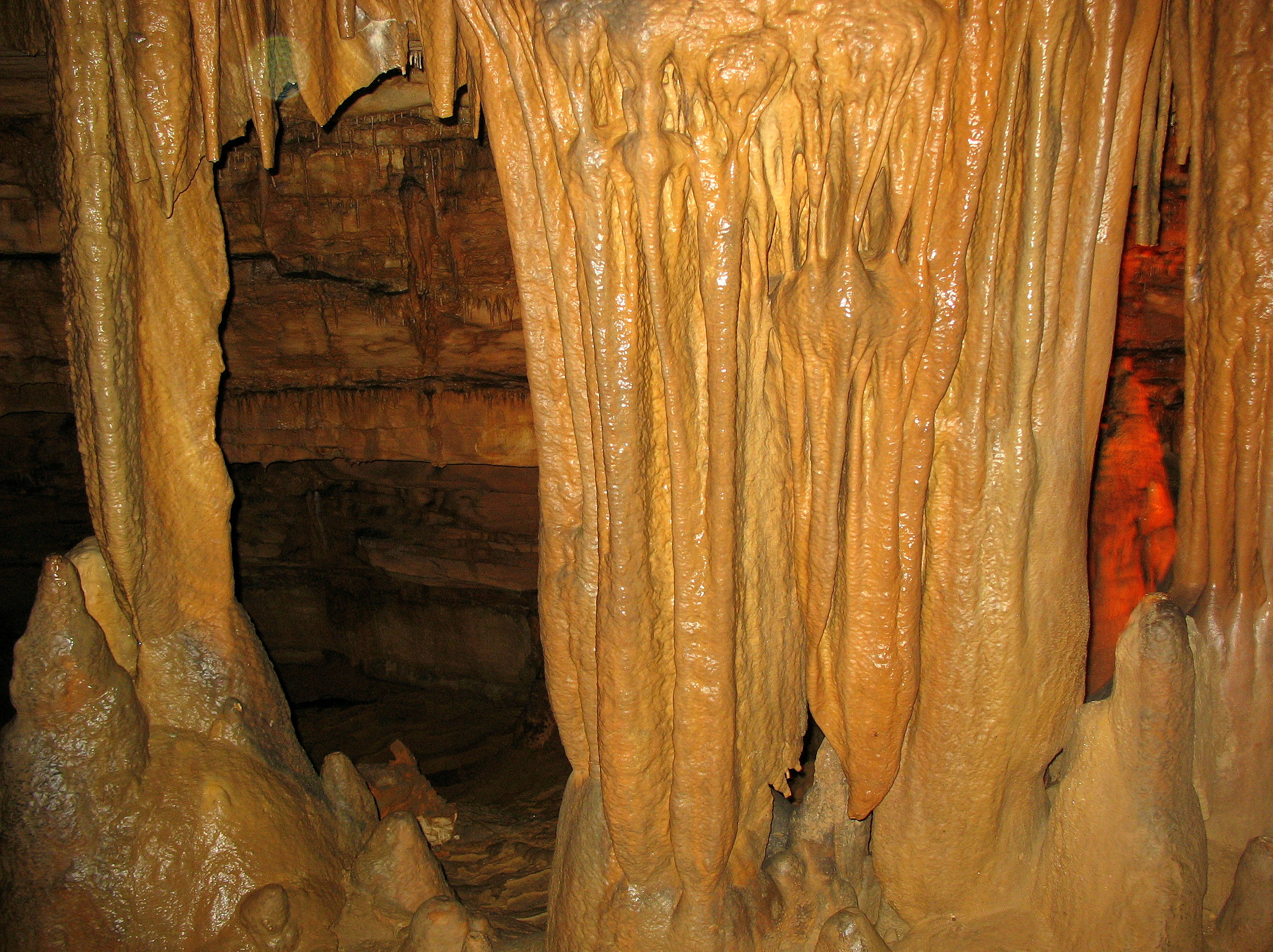
- Formations seen during a tour in the cave.

- Location within Indiana Location within the United States
- Location: Crawford County, Indiana
- Nearest city: Marengo
- Coordinates: 38°22′32″N 86°20′24″W
- Area: 7 acres (2.8 ha)
- Owner: Private
- Website: Official website

U.S. National Natural Landmark
- Designated: 1984

Marengo Cave is a privately owned cave located in Marengo, Indiana. One of only four show caves in Indiana, public tours of the cave have been given since 1883. Tours commenced just days after the cave's discovery by two school children. The cave was designated as a National Natural Landmark in 1984.

== Discovery ==
Marengo Cave was discovered on September 6, 1883. There are many early descriptions and some confusion about the date and the story of how the cave was discovered.

=== State's story ===
"Marengo cave has been known only since 1883. The cave was first entered on Thursday, September 6, 1883, by two children of the name of Hiestand. The children were at play in the grove and were attracted to the opening at the bottom of a sink hole. Accounts as to why they ventured into the opening differ. For some reason the story is told that they followed a rabbit into the opening and this led to the discovery of the cave. Mr. Stewart and those connected with the cave emphatically deny the rabbit story and say the discovery is due solely to childish curiosity. It is significant that shortly preceding the discovery, the virgin timber had been removed from the hillside upon which the entrance was found. Mr Stewart thinks this favored increased gullying and that the increase in runoff was the main factor in opening the hole in the sink.

The children did not venture far into the cave, certainly not beyond the zone of light, but they realized there was a great interior opening. The discovery was not mentioned until the Sunday following at which time the first party of explorers, people of the vicinity entered. Mr. Stewart upon whose land the discovery was made noticed that people returning from the cave were carrying numerous mineral formations that they had broken from the walls or ceiling. Realizing that the feature must be an unusual one he wisely prohibited the breaking and carrying away of the mineral deposits. This early protection is largely responsible for the nearly unmutilated character of the cave interior. Another incident, purely accidental, saved the most beautiful part of the cave from mutilation by the first party of explorers. The part of the cave to the right of the old entrance (as one enters) is known as Pillared Palace, Queen's Palace, and Crystal Palace, places that are literally filled with wonderful mineral formations. The first party of explorers did not notice this part of the cave upon entering and traversed the entire length of the cave, following much the same route now taken by tourists... When this part of the cave was first discovered, directions for the preservation of the mineral forms had already been given, so this section remains today in all of its primitive glory. Only the natural process of a hard winter freeze has slightly marred the interior decorations."

=== County's story ===
"On August 18, 1883, a few boys, while after a rabbit, made a discovery which added a remarkable charm to the town. In pursuit of the rabbit the boys chased it into some rocks. Not to be baffled in their determination they began to tear out a few of the loose rocks. The opening grew wider and the rocks came loose easier. To their great surprise the rabbit den grew bigger and bigger as they removed the loose rocks, until they saw that they were in the mouth of a large opening in the ground. The boys went back to the town and told what they had discovered. A large crowd of men and boys with lanterns and strings went to the opening to explore it. After getting a few rocks out of the way the men entered the opening which grew larger and larger until they found themselves in the mouth of a wonderful cave which was named the Marengo Cave. The cave is one of the most beautiful cave in the world. One can go through the cave and come out in about two hours. The walking is not so muddy and slippery as in other caves. Today the cave is visited by hundreds of men and women from all parts of the country. The cave is near the east end of the cemetery in old town.

=== Story as told by cave staff ===
Marengo Cave was discovered September 6, 1883, by siblings Orris and Blanche Hiestand. Orris was 11 years old at the time, and his sister Blanche was 15. Blanche worked as a cook at the local Marengo Academy and had heard some of the boys discussing a sinkhole they had found in the woods close. They suspected it might lead to a cave and were talking of returning with lanterns later. Blanche decided to beat the boys to it. She ran home from school that day, enlisted her brother Orris, took two candles and set off into the woods. The children crawled down a narrow passageway, approximately 50 feet long, and were the first humans known to set foot in Marengo Cave. Awed by what they had seen but quickly becoming afraid of the darkness they retreated back to the surface.

Three days later they notified the land owner, Samual Stewart whose land they had been trespassing on when they discovered the cave. The kids thought they had found diamonds because of the sparkling flowstone formations their candles revealed briefly while they were inside the cave. Believing the cave to possibly contain diamonds, Stewart quickly organized a group of men from the town and explored the cavern. Guided tours started soon afterwards for one quarter per person.

The Stewart family continued ownership of the cave until 1955 when Floyd Denton purchased the cave with great plans for development. Unfortunately, his plans were cut short when he died of a stroke in 1961. The present ownership purchased the cave in 1973 during the period when Interstate 64 was being constructed through southern Indiana. With better roads, an increasingly mobile population and aggressive promotion and quality improvements, the cave business began to grow again. The cave and surrounding park have grown nearly continuously during the past 40 years.

== Recent news ==
1992

A small crawlway known as "Blowing Bat Crawl" was finally broken through on June 14, 1992, leading to the discovery of the stream level of Marengo Cave. Approximately 3.5 miles were added to the cave's length with this discovery. The largest room of any cave in Indiana was also discovered in the stream level. There is almost 5 miles of known passageway to date at Marengo Cave, making it one of the longest caves in Indiana.

Today

Marengo cave is open all year long and offers two different walking tours. The Dripstone Trail tour covers 1 mile of the cave and takes approximately 60–70 minutes to complete. The Crystal Palace tour takes 35–40 minutes to complete and covers one third mile of the cave. Both tours see different sections of the cave and are not similar.

Movies have been filmed in Marengo Cave, including Abby (1974), Madison (2001), starring Jim Caviezel and Jake Lloyd, and, most recently, Fire from Below (2008), starring Kevin Sorbo.

== Other show caves in Indiana ==
- Wyandotte Caves
- Bluespring Caverns
- Squire Boone Caverns
- Indiana Caverns
