= Johnpaul Jones =

American architect and landscape architect

Johnpaul Jones (born July 24, 1941) is an American architect and landscape architect, partner in Seattle-based architecture firm Jones & Jones Architects and Landscape Architects, best known for innovative habitat immersion method design of zoo exhibits. A person who self-identifies as Native American, he has also executed many projects for various Native American organizations, and was lead design consultant for the Smithsonian Institution's National Museum of the American Indian, completed 2004 in Washington, D.C. He was the first architect ever to receive the National Humanities Medal.

== Education and early career ==
Jones was born in Okmulgee, Oklahoma to Welsh-American father Johnpaul Jones and Choctaw/Cherokee mother Dolores. His maternal grandfather was Choctaw and his maternal grandmother Pearl Gurley was Choctaw/Cherokee. Neither parent had more than a grade school education. His parents marriage had largely ended by the time he was 9 years old, and he and his mother moved to Manteca, California under an Indian relocation program. In Oklahoma, he had been instructed in Native American traditions by his maternal grandmother Pearl; in California (Manteca and later Stockton) he lived in a largely Hispanic environment and at times did farm work, which was his mother's occupation.

Although he did poorly in school other than excelling in art classes and physical education, he managed to graduate from high school in 1959, and attended San Jose City College. A job as an office boy at architecture firm Higgins & Root in San Jose, combined with his drawing skills set him on the first steps of his career. With help from his boss Chester Root he entered the University of Oregon in Eugene, Oregon, where for the first time he became a serious student, and where he began his interest in Native American architecture, more neglected in the U. of O. curriculum of the time than not. He continued to work summers at Higgins & Root.

After graduating in 1967, he moved in Seattle, working briefly for Paul Thiry, then at Dersham & Dimmick, before opening a practice on Bainbridge Island. He became increasingly involve in Native American matters, joining the Urban Indian Committee, where he first came to know Native activist Bernie Whitebear. In the early 1970s, he met landscape architect Grant Richard Jones (no relation), who was studying the Native American burial mounds of the Midwest. In 1973, he joined Grant Jones and Grant's then-wife Ilze Jones at Jones & Jones, based in the Globe Building in Seattle's Pioneer Square neighborhood.

== Work at Jones and Jones ==
=== Zoo projects ===
Although his colleague Grant Jones led the pioneering immersion exhibit work on the Gorilla exhibit and the African Savannah exhibit at Seattle's Woodland Park Zoo, Johnpaul Jones has led numerous zoo projects since that time. Among these are:

- Tiger River Trail, San Diego Zoo
- Asian elephant house, Woodland Park Zoo
- Polar bear habitat, Point Defiance Zoo, Tacoma, Washington
- Honolulu Zoo master plan
- Plans and exhibits, Arizona-Sonoran Desert Museum
- African Savannah master plan and exhibits, Perth Zoo, Perth, Australia
- Jake L. Mamon Gorilla Conservation Research Center, Dallas Zoo
- National Zoo of Belize master plan

Source for list:

=== Heritage and visitors' center projects ===
He has also done numerous heritage and visitors' center projects. Prominent among these have been:

- Gene Coulon Beach Park, Renton, Washington
- Newcastle Beach Park Buildings, Bellevue, Washington
- Southeast Alaska Discovery Center, Ketchikan, Alaska (with Charles Beattisworth and Company, Inc.).
- Sleeping Lady Mountain Retreat and Conference Center, Leavenworth, Washington
- Bainbridge Island Japanese American Exclusion Memorial Phase II, Bainbridge, Washington

Source for list:

=== Native American projects ===
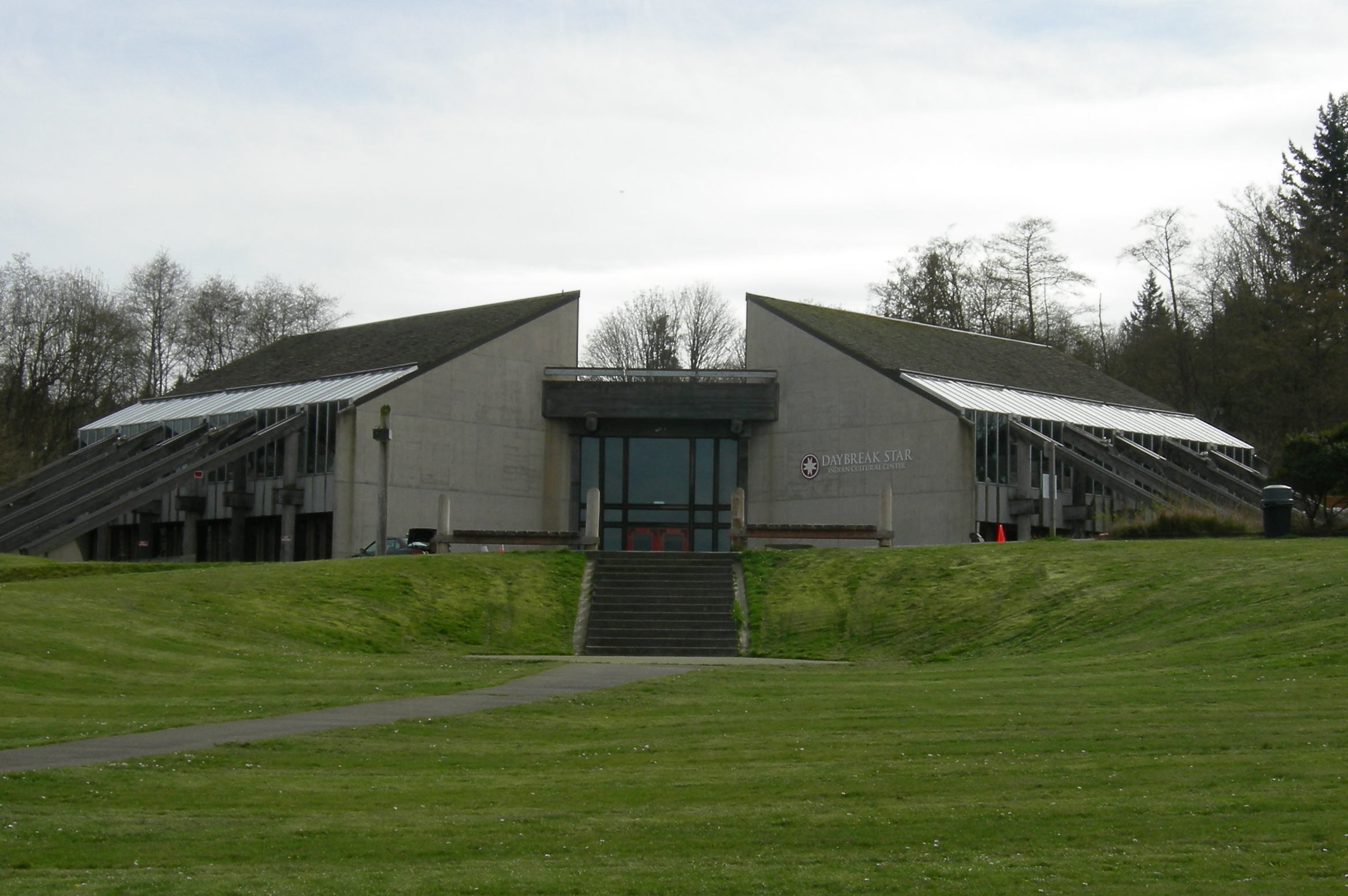
Daybreak Star Cultural Center (completed 1977)

Another focus has been projects related to his self-identified Native American heritage. Among these are:

- Daybreak Star Cultural Center (with Arai/Jackson and Lawney Reyes) and People's Lodge expansion, Discovery Park (Seattle)
- Longhouse Project, The Evergreen State College, Olympia, Washington
- The Agua Caliente Cultural Museum, Palm Springs, California
- The Aquinnah Cultural Center Master Plan for the Wampanoag Tribe of Gay Head, Martha's Vineyard, Massachusetts
- The Colville Confederated Tribes Museum Master Plan, Colville, Washington
- The De'aht Tribal Elders Longhouse center for Makah Indian Tribe, Neah Bay, Washington
- The Southern Ute Museum and Cultural Center for the Southern Ute Indian Tribe, Ignacio, Colorado
- The Spokane Tribal Cultural Center Master Plan for the Spokane Tribe Planning Department, Wellpinit, Washington
- The Tiwyekinwes Cultural Center Master Plan for the Chief Joseph Band of the Nez Perce Indians, Nespelem, Washington
- Institute of American Indian Arts, Santa Fe, New Mexico
- Intellectual House, University of Washington, Seattle
- Santa Ynez Chumash Museum and Cultural Center for the Santa Ynez Band of Chumash Indians in Santa Ynez, California

Main source for list:

His Vancouver Land Bridge in Vancouver, Washington was designed in conjunction with Maya Lin as part of her Confluence Project. The bridge, "retracing part of the ancient Klickitat Trail Indian path with a curving, commemorative walkway above State Route 14" provides pedestrian access from Fort Vancouver to the Columbia River waterfront for the first time in decades.

Jones was lead design consultant for the Smithsonian Institution's National Museum of the American Indian. (Canadian architect Douglas Cardinal led the early phases of the project, but left.) Jones's involvement began when Heye Foundation was looking to house some of the collections that eventually became part of this museum. At that time, it looked like Ross Perot might acquire the collections for a new museum in Dallas, Texas, and Jones was involved on a consulting basis. According to Jones, the resulting museum "doesn't have a straight line in it... It centers around something very organic, that which is common to Indian communities around the nation. It centers around the four worlds: the natural world, the animal world, the human world and the spirit world... Within each one of those worlds is something that helped us in the design of this building, the site [and] the interiors."

== Diversity work ==
Since the 1980s, Jones has been involved in increasing diversity in the architectural and design professions. With David Fukui, Tom Kubota, Mel Streeter, and Marga Rose Hancock he co-founded the AIA Seattle Diversity Roundtable. Among other things, the Roundtable organized school outreach and established scholarships at the University of Washington. He has also worked on diversity initiatives at the University of Oregon, and is involved in the American Indian Council of Architects and Engineers and the National Association of Indian Architects and Engineers.

== Personal life ==
Jones married fellow University of Oregon student Hannah Stratton in 1965. They had two children, Sequoia and Ingrid, and divorced in 1990. Jones married for a second time to Marjorie Sheldon on September 21, 1997.
