= Southeast Alaska Discovery Center =

Visitor center in Ketchikan, Alaska

Coordinates: 55°20′26″N 131°38′39″W

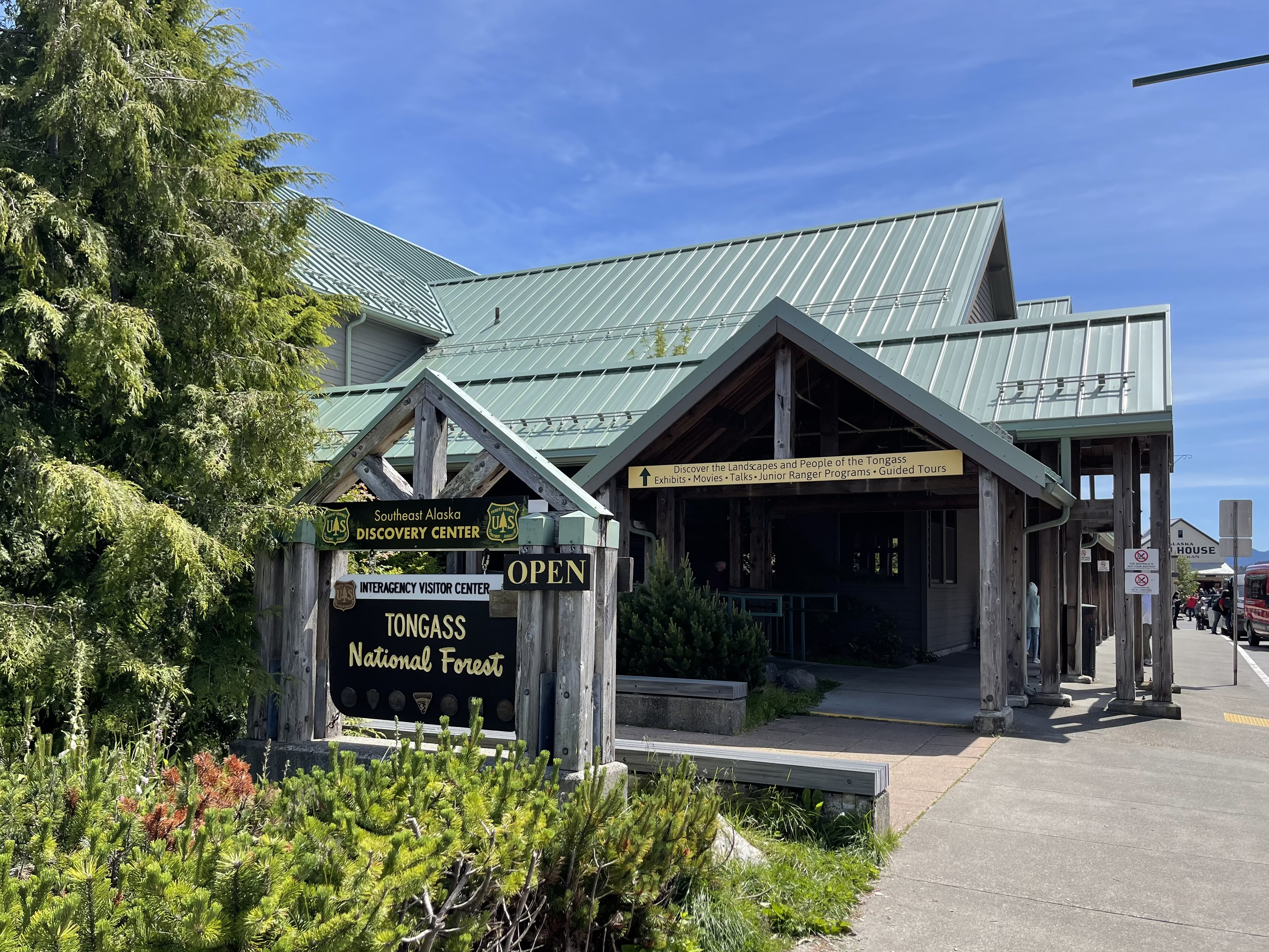
Southeast Alaska Discovery Center, Tongass National Forest, Ketchikan, Alaska

The Southeast Alaska Discovery Center is a visitor center in Ketchikan, Alaska, operated by the United States Forest Service as part of the Tongass National Forest. The center provides interpretive exhibits and activities about the ecology, economy and culture of Southeast Alaska and its temperate rainforest ecosystems.

== Design ==
The building was designed by Jones & Jones Architects and Landscape Architects, led by the team of Grant Jones and noted indigenous architect Johnpaul Jones.

== Exhibits ==
The Discovery Center has four main exhibit halls, focusing respectively on the coastal rainforest ecosystem, Alaska Native cultures, other ecosystems of Southeast Alaska, and modern human uses of natural resources. Additionally, there is an exhibit honoring Elizabeth Peratrovich, a Tlingit civil rights leader, for whom the center's theater is named.

== Gallery ==
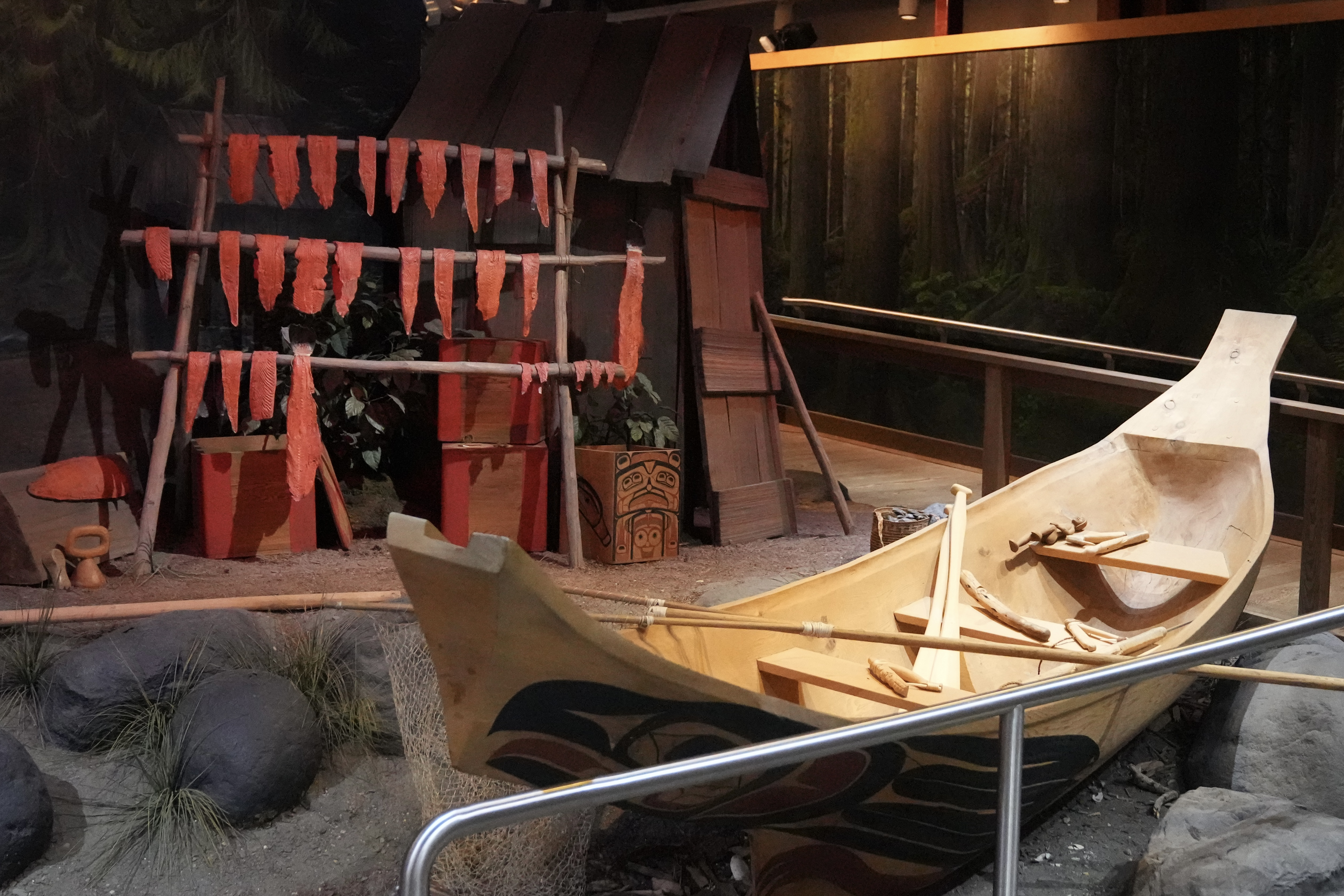
Southeast Alaska Discover Center, Ketchikan, Alaska. Fish camp, Tlingit, Haida, and Tsimshian. Salmon fillets were soaked in a salt solution, draped over drying racks to dry then taken to the smokehouse and hung over slow burning fires.

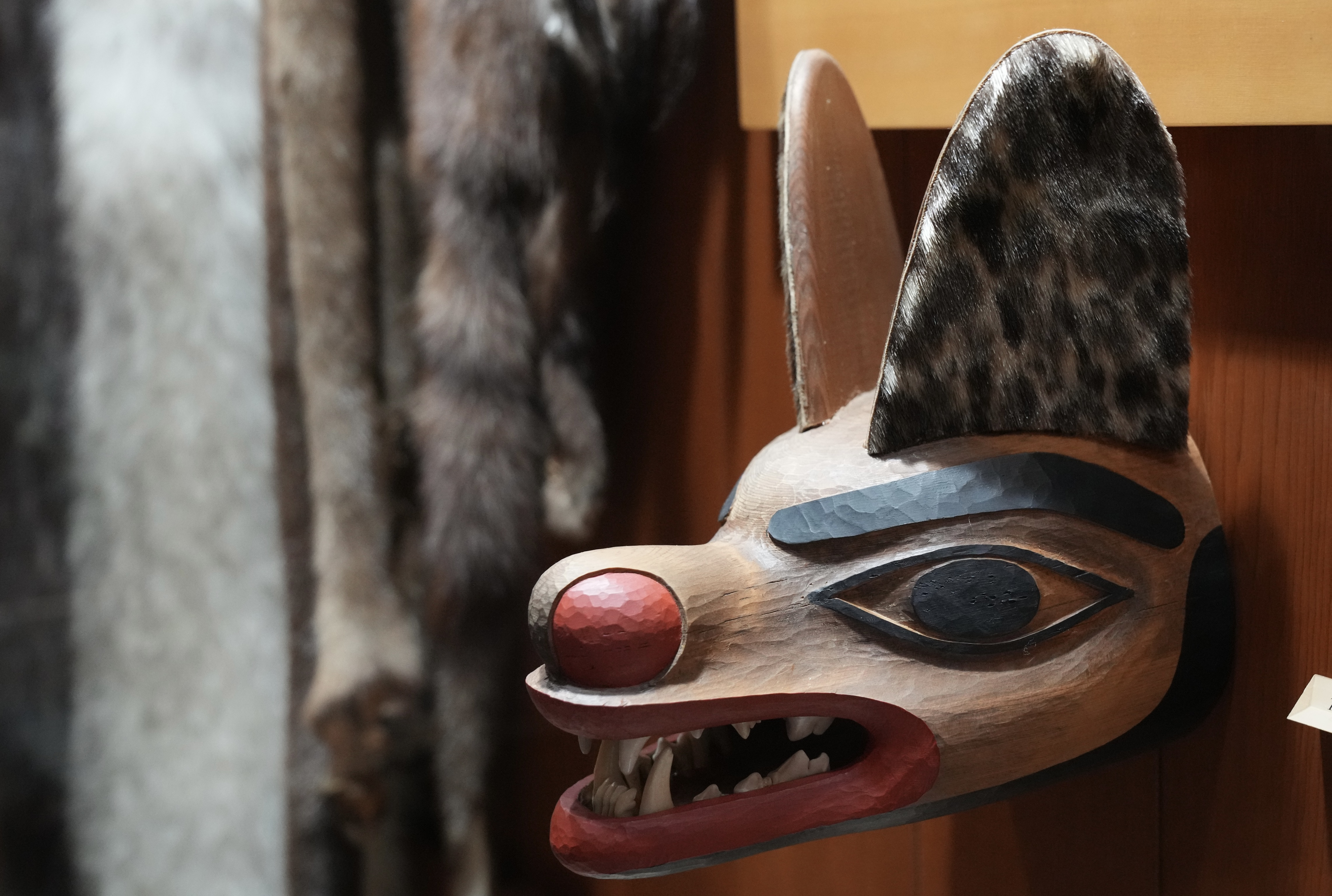
Tlingit Ceremonial Mask, Southeast Alaska Discovery Center, Ketchikan, Alaska

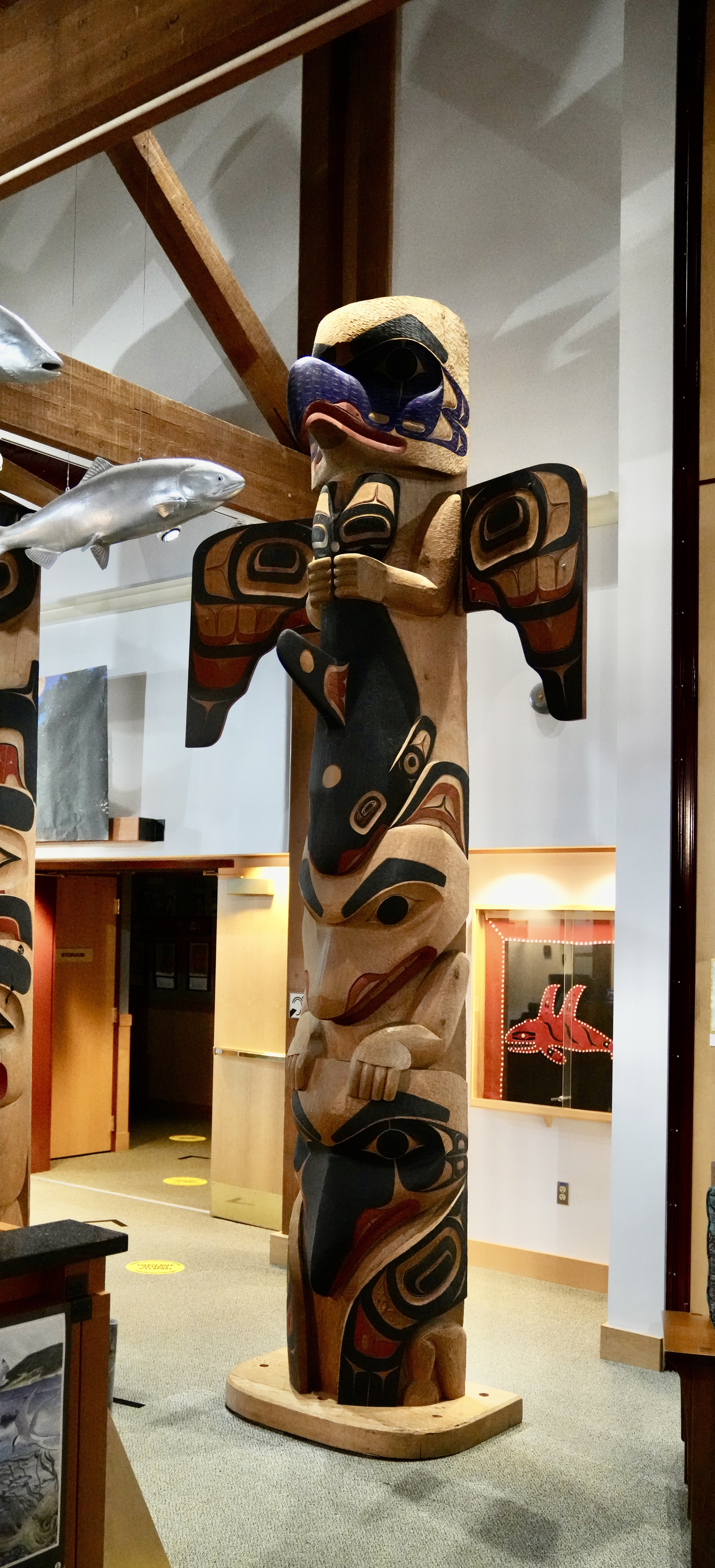
Totem Pole on display at the Southeast Alaska Discovery Center, Ketchikan, Alaska

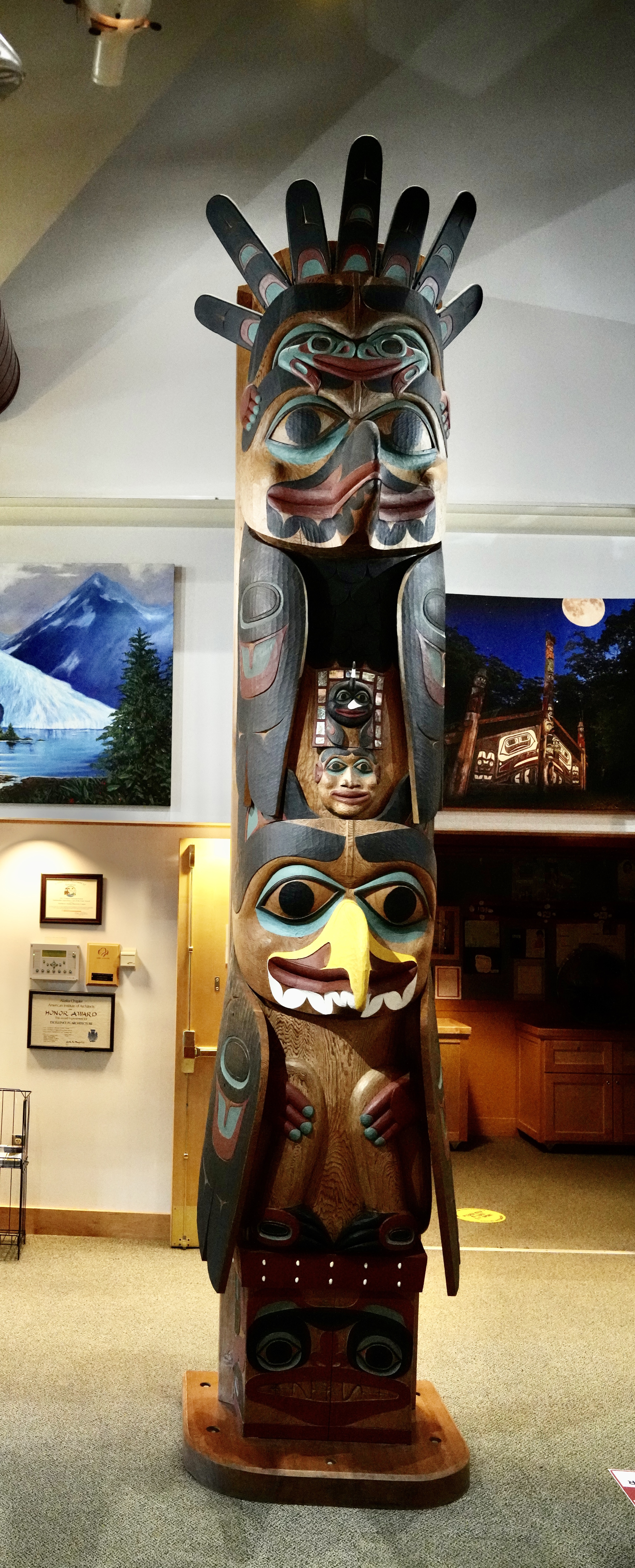
A Totem Pole on display at the Southeast Alaska Discovery Center, Ketchikan, Alaska

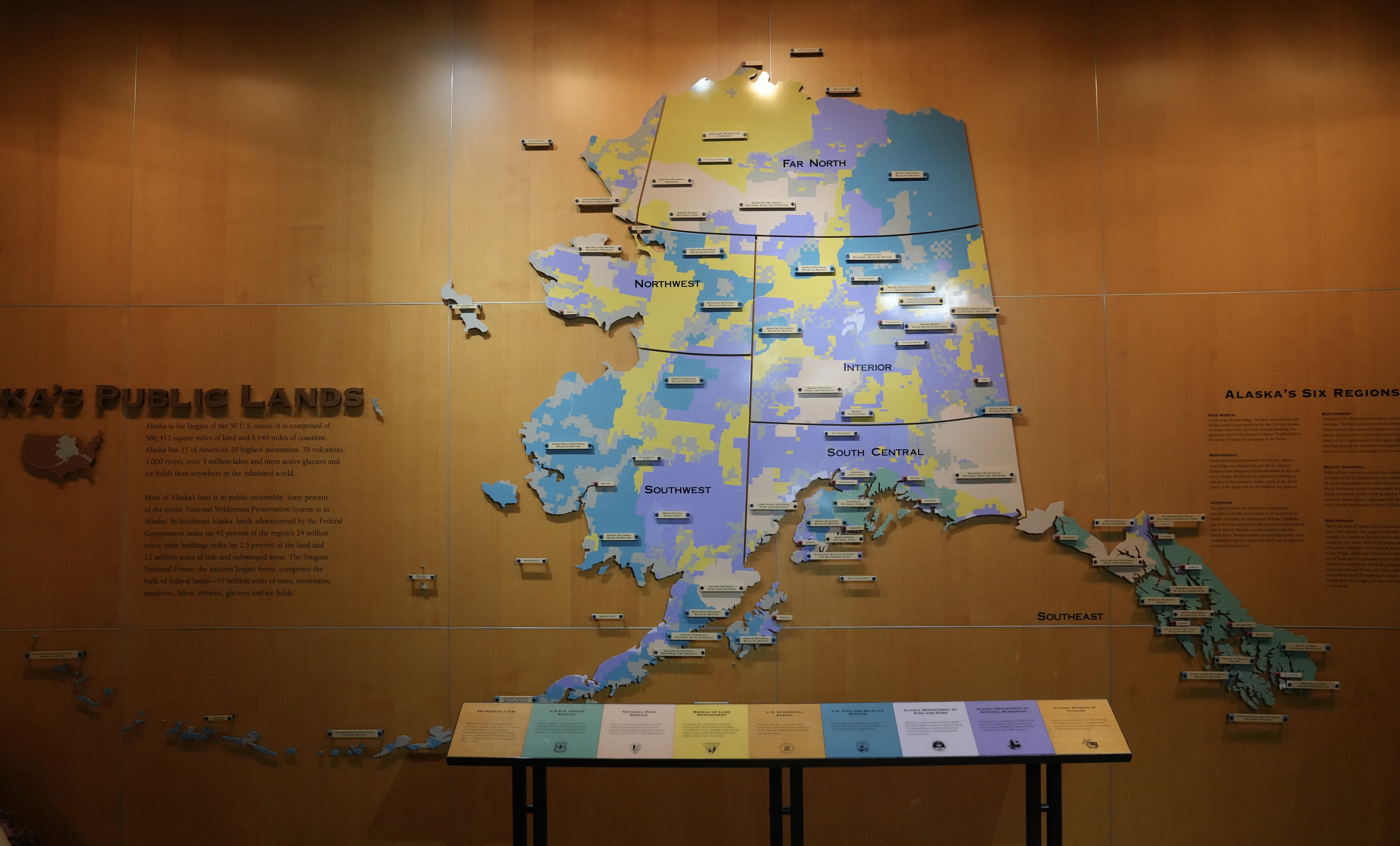
Most of Alaska’s land is in public ownership. Map of Alaska on display at the Southeast Alaska Discovery Center, Ketchikan, Alaska

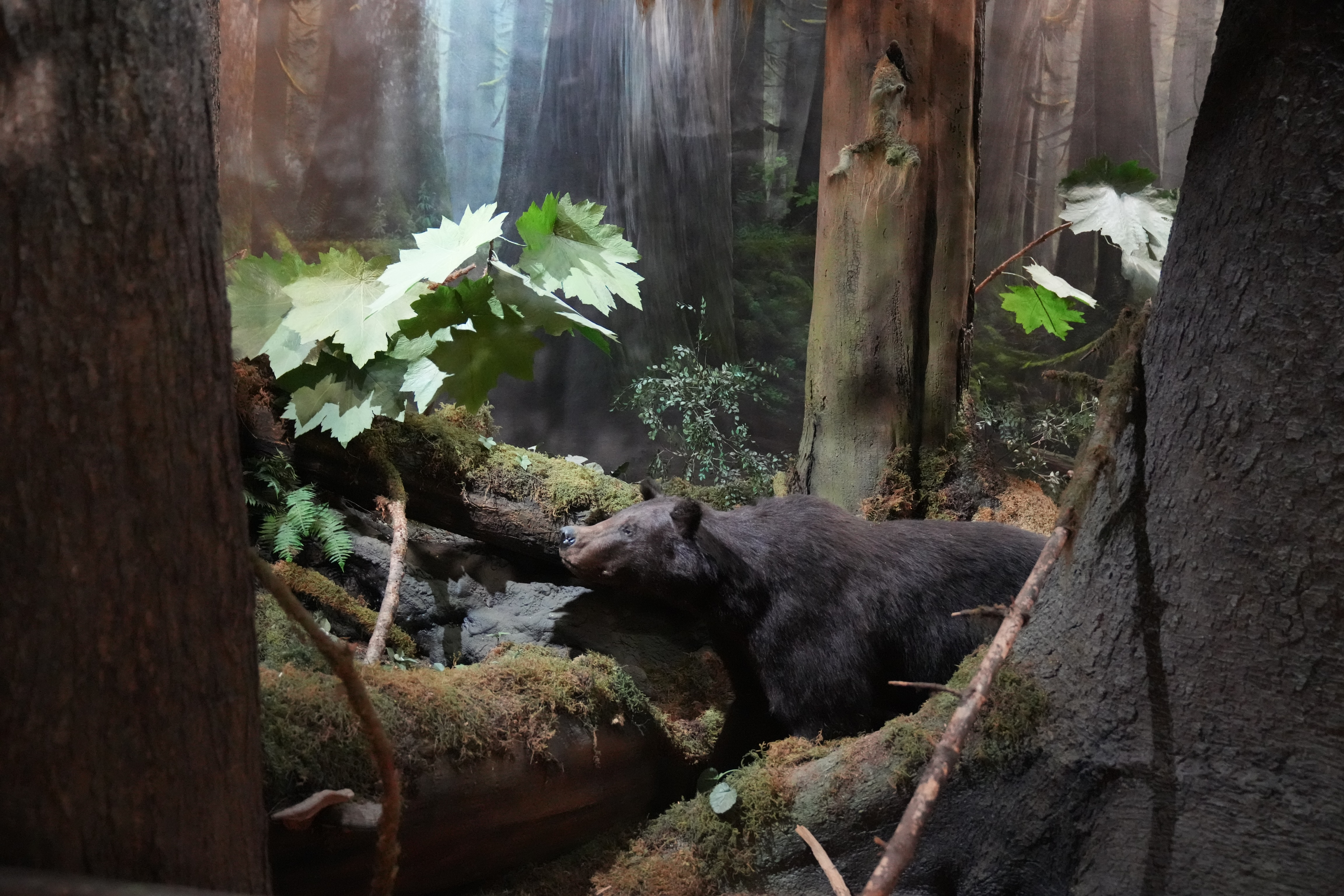
Alaskan Coastal Brown Bear, Southeast Alaska Discovery Center, Ketchikan, Alaska

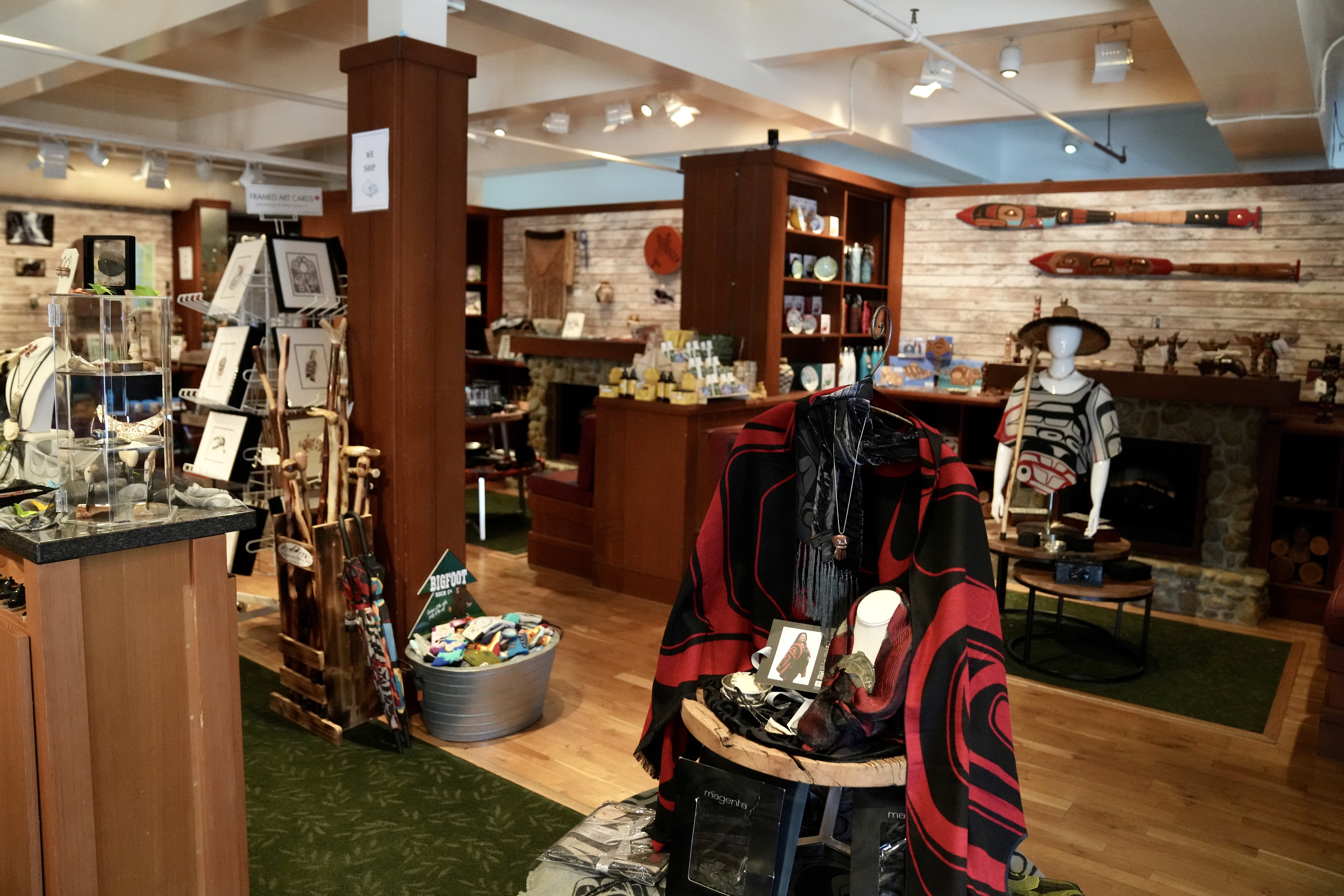
Southeast Alaska Discovery Center Gift Shop, Ketchikan, Alaska
