= Grant Jones =

American landscape architect and poet (1938–2021)

Grant Richard Jones (August 29, 1938 – June 21, 2021) was an American landscape architect, poet, and founding principal of the Seattle firm Jones & Jones Architects, Landscape Architects and Planners. In more than four decades of practice, his work in ecological design has garnered widespread recognition for its broad-based and singular approach, one that is centered on giving voice to the land and its communities (Enlow, 6–7). Called the “poet laureate of landscape architecture” (Miller, 7) Jones's poetry informs his designs (Jones, 10).

His firm—co-founded with Ilze Grinbergs Jones in 1969—has been at the forefront of the fields of landscape aesthetics, environmental planning, design for cultural spaces, and scenic and wildlife conservation (Woodbridge, 29, 60). Jones & Jones is perhaps best known for pioneering the habitat immersion method of zoo design at Seattle's Woodland Park Zoo, but their work has also transformed design and scenic planning practices for highways, rivers, parks, forests, watersheds, and communities (Streatfield, 20).

Jones & Jones is the recipient of more than 100 awards, including the first-ever Firm of the Year Award from the American Society of Landscape Architects (2003), the Richard J. Neutra Award for Professional Excellence (2007), and the President's Award of Excellence from the American Society of Landscape Architects (1980).

Jones died on June 21, 2021, at the age of 82.

== Early life and influences ==
Grant Jones grew up in Richmond Beach, Washington, a small community on Puget Sound located 10 miles north of Seattle. His father was architect Victor N. Jones. His mother, Ione Thomas Jones, encouraged his exploration of nature, particularly the tide flats below the family farm. This early, intimate connection with his home landscape would shape Jones's language and his understanding of place (Amidon, 14).

Jones received a Bachelor of Architecture from the University of Washington in 1962, and remained at UW as a Graduate Poet under Theodore Roethke until Roethke's death in 1963. His study with Roethke further strengthened his awareness of the connection between language and the natural world.

With the encouragement of his professor and mentor, landscape architect Richard Haag, Jones entered the graduate program for landscape architecture at Harvard University, where he received a master's degree in 1966. While at Harvard, Jones theorized that the distinct geologic and living forms that together define a landscape are just as much a language as the linguistic units that together comprise a poem. He created a Fortran model to catalog and measure the various intrinsic elements of a landscape and evaluate their influence on its overall aesthetic value. This early Fortran computer program would later inform his firm's ground-breaking work in visual resource assessment, including plans for the Nooksack River and Puget Sound (Miller, 7).

In 1966, Jones won Harvard's Frederick Sheldon Traveling Fellowship and spent the next two years exploring South America and Europe, searching for examples of regionally distinctive community planning, architecture, and culture. As Sheldon Fellow, Jones sought to revitalize the concept of environmental determinism, the idea that plants, animals, and people—as well as human culture and language—all evolve from their landscape, or physical environment. He also sought to demonstrate that the study of diverse cultural and architectural adaptations to place could serve as a model to improve development practices in American communities (Amidon, 19).

== Jones & Jones ==
Grant Jones returned to Seattle in 1969 and established Jones & Jones with his then-wife, Ilze Grinbergs Jones. Ilze and Grant had studied together at the University of Washington, and both shared the conviction that architecture and landscape architecture are inseparable disciplines (Enlow, 6–7). They had traveled together during the Sheldon Fellowship and were both strongly influenced by the principles of bioregionalism (Amidon, 21). Ilze Jones influenced the new practice through her love of the urban built environment and her interest in public green infrastructure, community building, and broad-scale environmental planning.

In 1973, the two were joined by Johnpaul Jones, an architect of Cherokee-Choctaw descent whose work designing cultural spaces has received wide acclaim. Deeply rooted in his Native American heritage and closely connected to the land, Johnpaul's designs include museums and other cultural spaces that honor and share the living heritages of indigenous people. Notable among them is the Smithsonian Institution’s National Museum of the American Indian on the Mall in Washington, D.C., for which he served as lead design consultant.

Jones & Jones has grown in subsequent years to include partner Mario Campos and a staff of more than a dozen architects and landscape architects. (Enlow, 7).

Landscape historian David C. Streatfield writes, “Their designs interpret place as bio-physical processes, and as intertwined acts of cultural will and transformation. […] Ever since its inception this firm has established new standards of excellence in analysis and creative design.” (Streatfield, 20) In conferring its highest honor, the Firm of the Year Award, the ASLA recognized Jones & Jones for “the unique culture it has created and its philosophy of embracing that which is challenging and unexplored. Its work and its commitment to future generations have created an enduring legacy…”

== Selected projects ==
In the early 1970s, Jones & Jones was commissioned by the Whatcom County Park Board to develop a preservation plan for the Nooksack River in northwest Washington State. The plan identified intrinsic landscape features of high aesthetic value and made recommendations for their preservation, while suggesting other areas that would be suitable for recreational uses. The study involved mapping the river's watershed and viewshed and then breaking it up into its component drainage basins, branches, channels, and floodplains. Each distinct river segment was then analyzed using a series of quantitative and qualitative measurements based on integrity, health, uniqueness, and resiliency. This was the first plan ever developed for a river, and the project received an Honor Award from the American Society of Landscape Architects (Amidon, 43).

The analytic methods employed by Jones & Jones in the study of the Nooksack River proved valuable to other projects requiring the careful management of visual resources. These included corridor planning for utilities and the design of roads. The firm has become well known for the design of scenic roadways and wildlife highways, considering them a vital form of green infrastructure.

In 1990, Jones was asked to join the design team for the expansion of the Paris to Lexington Road (aka Paris Pike), an historic 12-mile road leading from Lexington to Paris, Kentucky. The old two-lane highway could no longer handle the demands of increased traffic, but expanding the road to four lanes threatened the mature trees, historic stone fences, and original farm entrances along the route. It was the first time since World War II that a landscape architect had been approached to design a highway (Amidon, 34). Jones’ solution was to break the highway into two separate ribbons that weave through the landscape independently, while ensuring that the most characteristic features of the landscape remain intact.

U.S. Highway 93 crosses the Flathead Indian Reservation in western Montana, nation of the Confederated Salish and Kootenai Tribes of the Flathead Nation (CSKT). The 55-mile stretch of road runs north from Evaro to Polson, Montana, traversing a majestic landscape of expansive valleys and mountain ranges that is home to a great diversity of wildlife, including grizzly bears, deer, elk, bighorn sheep, and painted turtles. For much of its history, the highway sliced straight through the landscape, through small communities and towns, and through wildlife habitat, resulting in the decline of some species and in numerous roadway fatalities (Jones & Jones, 1–4).

Working closely with the CSKT, along with the Federal Highway Administration and the Montana Department of Transportation, Jones & Jones redesigned the highway to respond to and respect the unique aesthetic and ecological characteristics of the landscape, seeking ways for the land to influence the road. As the firm notes, “The design of the reconstructed highway is premised on the idea that the road is a visitor” (Jones & Jones, 1).

The design concepts for the highway, begun in 2000, sought to simultaneously encourage understanding of the land and of the communities that call it home, including the Salish and Kootenai people and rich populations of plants and animals (Jones & Jones, 1). In addition to following the topography and respecting cultural concerns, a key objective of the design process was the development of numerous wildlife crossing areas designed to ensure the safe passage of animals over or under the roadway. Road-kill data was analyzed, along with historic migration patterns, to determine where to site crossings in an effort to restore traditional wildlife movement routes.

U.S. Highway 93 now features forty wildlife crossing structures. The project received the Transportation Planning Excellence Award from the Federal Highway Administration in 2008.

Jones & Jones pioneered the habitat immersion approach to zoo design with the development of the gorilla and African savannah exhibits at Seattle's Woodland Park Zoo (Hyson, 23; Hancocks, 118). In 1978, zoo director David Hancocks approached the firm for a master plan. Rather than the traditional arrangement of animal enclosures behind concrete walls and bars, Hancocks and his design team, led by Grant Jones, sought to recreate the animals’ natural habitat. The gorilla forest was developed in the first phase of the project: careful manipulation of landform, plants, and sight lines immersed not only the gorillas but also the visitors in the animals’ native habitat.

The landscape immersion method has been described as “an astonishing departure from conventional zoo design because it reflected a pronounced shift in philosophy” from a homocentric to a biocentric view of the world (Hancocks, 118). The philosophy is now widespread (Hyson, 23), and since the late 1970s, Jones & Jones has developed master plans and specialized habitat designs for scores of zoos on four continents.

ILARIS (Intrinsic Landscape Aesthetic Resource Information System) is a GIS model developed by Jones & Jones to assess the intrinsic aesthetic value of Puget Sound. In 2002, the firm was commissioned by the Trust for Public Land to develop a system to evaluate and protect important landscape features of Puget Sound and its near-shore areas.

ILARIS was based on Grant Jones’ early Fortran program from his days at Harvard, as well as on Jones & Jones’ breakthrough scenic planning work for rivers such as the Nooksack and Alaska's Susitna. The model is a framework to synthesize and assess the biologic, cultural, and aesthetic values of intrinsic landscape features, and the result is a language that gives voice to the landscape and assists conservation and planning organizations in making land-use decisions. In 2005 ILARIS received a Research and Communication Merit Award from the Washington Chapter of the American Society of Landscape Architects (WASLA), and in 2006 the model won the National ASLA Professional Award of Honor in the Research Category.

== Selected awards ==
- Landscape Architecture Foundation Medal, Landscape Architecture Foundation. First recipient was Grant Jones, FASLA, in 2016. This award is conveyed to a landscape architect for distinguished work over a career in applying the principles of sustainability to landscapes. The award may recognize academic research and publication; public practice and policy; or private practice in built or designed landscapes. The honoree exemplifies the ethics of LAF and demonstrates a significant advancement of the profession with a clear and demonstrable focus on sustainability in landscape architecture.
- Roll of Honor, University of Washington College of Built Environments Roll of Honor. Grant Jones was inducted into the Roll of Honor, April 29, 2015.
- Transportation Planning Excellence Award, Federal Highway Administration and Federal Transit Administration. Design for the Reconstruction of US Highway 93, Flathead Indian Reservation, Evaro to Polson, Montana, 2008.
- Honor Award, Research Category; American Society of Landscape Architects (ASLA). ILARIS: Intrinsic Landscape Aesthetic Resource Information System, 2006.
- Distinguished Member Award, )Honor Society of Sigma Lambda Alpha. Given to Grant Jones for his continued high quality contributions to the scholarship of landscape architecture and the outstanding quality of design work that he has brought to the profession of landscape architecture, 2005.
- Merit Award, Design; ASLA. Cedar River Watershed Education Center, Cedar Falls, Washington, 2004.
- First Recipient—Firm of the Year Award, ASLA, 2003.
- Award for Public Open Space and Recreation, Australian Institute of Landscape Architects. Trail of Elephants, Melbourne Zoo, Melbourne, Australia, 2003.
- Environmental Award of Excellence, Federal Highway Administration. Paris Lexington Road, Lexington, Kentucky, 2003.
- National Merit Award in Communications, ASLA, Time Places Heritage Signs, Mountains to Sound Greenway, Seattle, 2000.
- Best Exhibit of the Year Award, American Zoo and Aquarium Association (AZA), Thai Elephant Forest, Woodland Park Zoological Gardens, Seattle, 1990.
- President’s Award of Excellence, ASLA, New Exhibits and Public Spaces, Woodland Park Zoological Gardens, Seattle, 1980.
- Honor Award, ASLA, The Nooksack River Plan, Bellingham, Washington, 1974.

== Selected publications ==
- Jones, Grant R. and Walter Henze, editors., Okanogan Poems Vol. 3 Eighteen Poets: Landscapes are Observatories (Seattle: Skookumchuck Press with CreateSpace an Amazon Company, 2016).
- Jones, Grant R. and Mike Robinson., Naming Water 48 Poems: Voices for Beaches, Marshes, Swamps, Creeks & Rivers (Seattle: Skookumchuck Press, 2014).
- Jones, Grant R. editor., Okanogan Poems Vol. 2 Seventeen Poets (Seattle: Skookumchuck Press, 2013).
- Jones, Grant R. editor., Okanogan Poems Vol. 1 Five Poets (Seattle: Skookumchuck Press, 2009).
- Jones, Grant R., Cory Parker, and Charles Scott, “Designing America’s Wildlife Highway: Montana’s U.S. Highway 93,” The Western Planner, December 2008, 6–9.
- Jones, Grant R., et al., “Architectural Poetry: Jones & Jones Builds on the Ideas of People and Place,” Western Art and Architecture, Fall-Winter 2008–2009.
- Jones, Grant R., What Rocks Know: Selected Poems (Seattle: Skookumchuck Press, 2008).
- Jones, Grant R., et al., “Applying Visual Resource Assessment for Highway Planning” and “Zoo Design,” in Landscape Architectural Graphic Standards ed. Leonard J. Hopper (New York: John Wiley & Sons, Inc, 2006).
- Jones, Grant R., “The Fullness,” Landscape Journal 20, no. 1 (2001), 4–12.
- Jones, Grant R. and Megan Atkinson, “Making a Marriage with the Land: The Future of the Landscape,” Landscape and Urban Planning: A Journal of Landscape Ecology, Planning, and Design, vol. 45, nos. 2–3 (October 1997), 61–92.
- Jones, Grant R., Dennis Oost, and Ron Thomas, “Bioregional Design,” Arcade: The Journal of Architecture/Design in the Northwest, Spring 1997.
- Jones, Grant R., Brian Gray, and Michael Sweeney, “Saving the Nooksack,” in Water and the Landscape ed. Grady Clay (New York: McGraw Hill, 1979), 130–137.
- Jones, Grant R., “Landscape Assessment...Where Logic and Feelings Meet,” Landscape Architecture, vol. 68, no. 3 (March 1978), 113–115.
- Jones, Grant R., An Inventory and Evaluation of the Environmental, Aesthetic and Recreational Resources of the Upper Susitna River, Alaska. Department of the Army, Alaska District Corps of Engineers, Contract no. DACW85-74-C-0057, March 1975.
- Jones, Grant R., “A Method for the Quantification of Aesthetic Values for Environmental Decision Making,” Nuclear Technology, vol. 25, April 1975.
- Jones, Grant R., “Design as Ecogram,” Development Series, University of Washington, College of Architecture and Urban Planning, vol. 1, no. 1, Spring 1975.
