= David Hancocks =

British architect (born 1941)

- Born: 5 May 1941 (age 85)
- Education: BSc in Architecture & Building Engineering, University of Bath, 1966. MArch, U. Bath 1968
- Known for: Zoo Planning and Exhibit Design

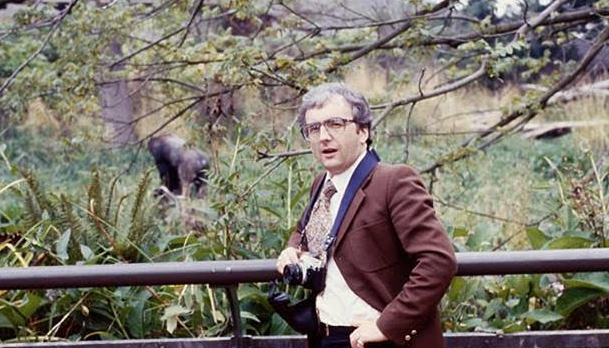
David Hancocks at Woodland Park Zoo, 1979. Photo by Helen Freeman.

David Hancocks (born 5 May 1941) is a British architect and designer for zoos, natural history museums, botanic gardens and nature centres, and a former zoo and museum director. Notable for overseeing the creation of the Woodland Park Zoo's revolutionary gorilla exhibit, which for the first time utilised mature trees with natural foliage merged seamlessly for both the animals and the visitors. The technique was dubbed a landscape immersion exhibit, and has become the often imitated standard for accredited zoos across the globe.

== History and early career ==
David Hancocks was born and raised in Kinver, England. After his studies at the School of Architecture, University of Bath, he was the first graduate to receive a degree from that new university: a Bachelor of Science in 1966, followed by a Masters in Architecture in 1968. Frustrated by the rigid focus on style and form in architecture, Hancocks spent two years in the architecture office at London Zoo and a further year as head of design and exhibition at Bristol Zoo, aiming to learn how to design around animal behavioral needs, hoping to apply those lessons to designing for humans. He found the problems of zoo design so challenging and so little studied he decided to devote his time to that endeavor. He had never visited a zoo before starting work at the London Zoo in 1967.

=== Work at the Woodland Park Zoo ===
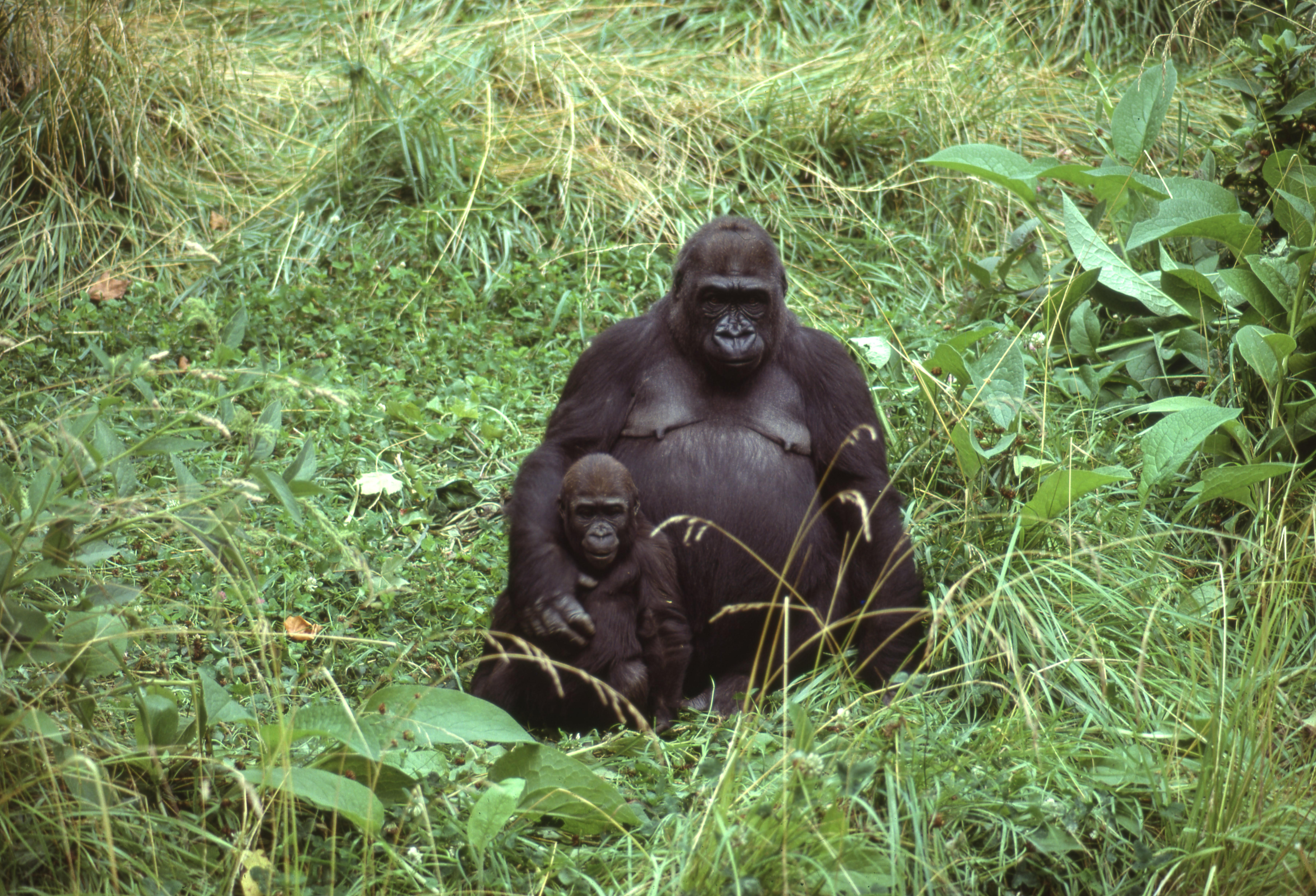
Gorilla ’Nina’ with baby 'Wanto' in the new exhibition habitat. Photo by David Hancocks.

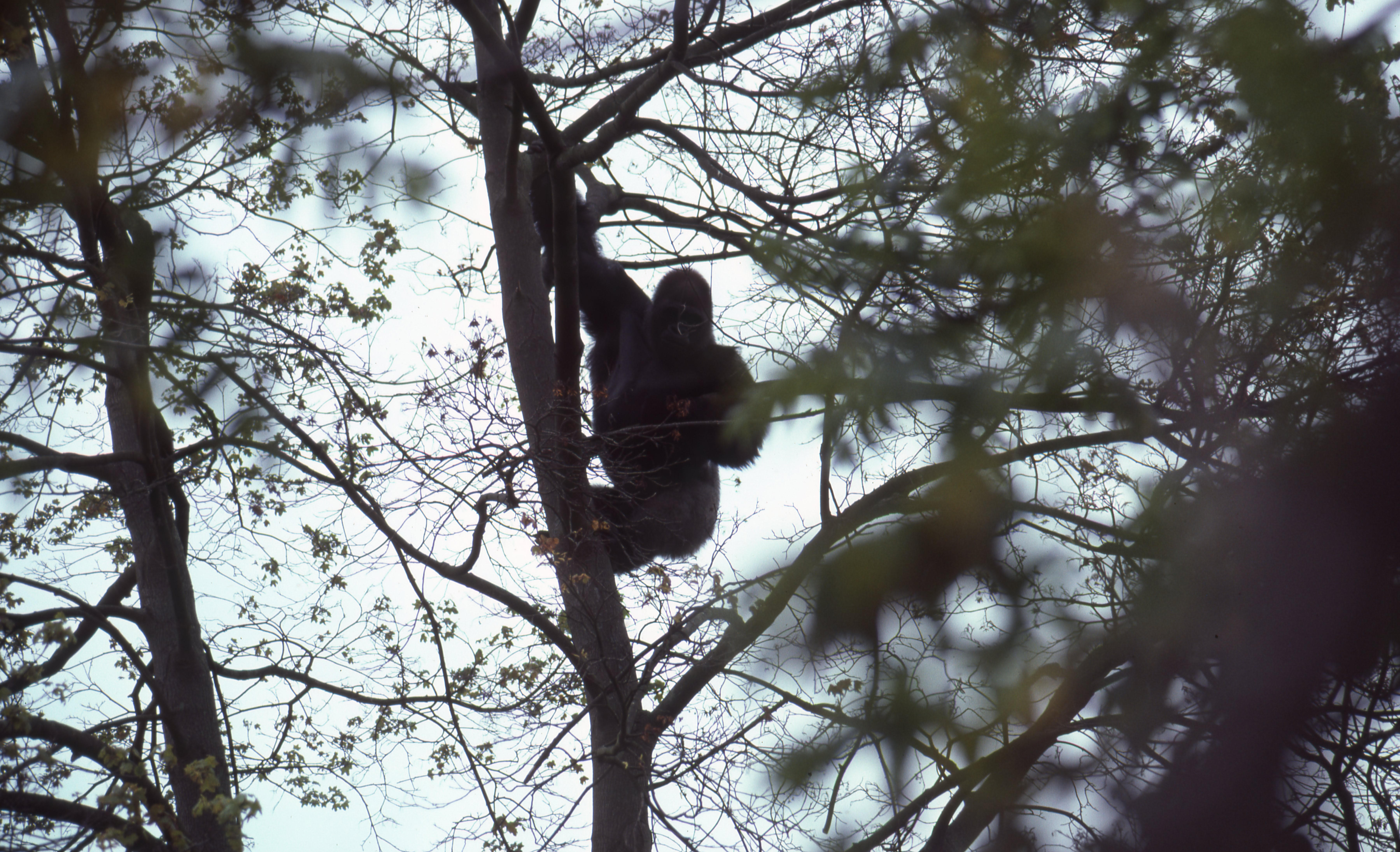
Silverback gorilla Kiki spent many hours most days climbing high into the trees. Photo by David Hancocks.

After writing the book Animals and Architecture in 1971, Hancocks was brought on to become the design coordinator for the Woodland Park Zoo in Seattle, Washington. Hancocks hoped to take into account the physiological and psychological needs of the animals by creating a replicated version of their own environments, taking into account natural foliage and geological forms, with special consideration taken to make the indoor spaces for the gorillas acoustically pleasant and with ample natural light, allowing them to sleep under the stars and moonlight. The strategies and techniques of placing both animals and zoo visitors in the same replicated naturalistic landscape became known as "landscape immersion." Hancocks hoped that this methodology would provide better and more interesting landscapes for the animals, and encourage visitors who were experiencing the same landscape to recognise, if only subconsciously, the vital links between wild animals and their habitats, anticipating they might then come to realise that the best way to help endangered animals is to preserve their wild habitats. This first example of landscape immersion was opened in July 1979.

The techniques were met with ample criticism from other zoos. Directors and curators were unhappy about not seeing the gorillas clearly amid the vegetation, about them being able to wander too far away and even out of sight if they chose to, and prophesied that the gorillas would kill all the vegetation. Seattle zoo-goers had a different reaction to the zoo professionals. Their behavior, like the gorillas, changed: they became more relaxed, and spent much longer observing the animals, and talking in whispers rather than the shouting and window banging that had been the norm in the Zoo's old Ape House. . The only zoo directors to take notice and implement similar features were Terry Maple of Zoo Atlanta and Bernard Harrison of the Singapore Zoo. It would take approximately 12 years for any other zoos to adopt the philosophies of landscape immersion exhibits. After this, the technique of landscape immersion exhibits became the standard for zoos, and many worked to imitate the animal's natural environment as closely as possible, rather than abstracted or plainly practical exhibits. After serving as design coordinator for two years Hancocks became director of the zoo in 1976, retiring in frustration in 1984 having first failed to get Seattle politicians to approve sending the Zoo's elephants to a warmer climate with more space, and then failing to persuade Seattleites on two occasions to approve a proposed Bond Issue to give the elephants at Woodland Park Zoo badly needed improved and larger facilities. His departure spurred a fund drive to build new quarters for the elephants.

=== Other work ===
David Hancocks went on to become the director of Tucson's Arizona-Sonora Desert Museum from 1989 to 1997, and became the director of the Werribee Open Range Zoo near Melbourne as well as the strategic development director for Zoos Victoria, encompassing the Healesville Sanctuary, the Melbourne Zoo as well as the Werribee Open Range Zoo, from 1998 to 2003. In 2001 his book A Different Nature: The Paradoxical World of Zoos and Their Uncertain Future explored the history and the future of zoos, using his experiences working on animal enclosures and habitats.

== Activism and criticism of zoos ==
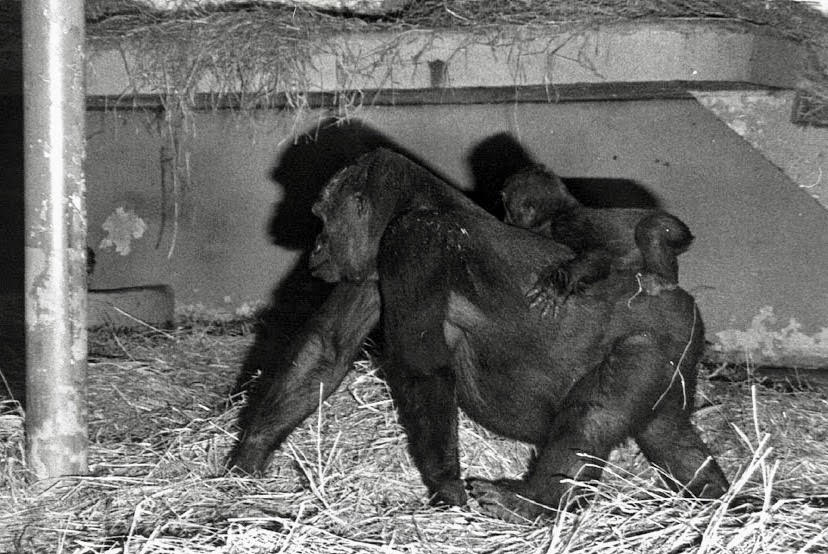
Nina with baby Wanto in the Zoo's old Ape House. Photo by Seattle Parks Department.

Hancocks has become an outspoken critic of zoos and similar institutions, claiming that they are fundamentally unchanged, advancing very little beyond superficial improvements since the era of Victorian menageries, and must realise that their power must be put towards conservation and education by changing their scope and concept. To this point, Hancocks has stated his concern that zoos' persistent focus on charismatic megafauna and on individual animal species, rather than their place in ecosystems as a whole, detracts from the overall message of conservation and ecology that zoos have the potential to achieve. Hancocks equates zoos to museums by saying that both are "object-driven" as opposed to thematically "story-driven." He criticises zoos for merely selecting an object or an animal for display, rather than selecting a path of information and choosing objects to enhance it. Hancocks has stated that for zoos to achieve their potential, they must move away from simply being places that put animals on display, and instead evolve into all-encompassing natural history museums with a focus on the whole of Nature, and on improved animal welfare. Hancocks has also stated the possibility of reducing the number of zoos in more regulated environments, and better matching animals to their climates, comparing the potential of zoos to Disney parks, and claiming that with a handful of very large zoos they could become tourist attractions that would generate more money, better standards, and higher welfare for the animals, rather than many spread-out animal exhibitions with different rules and styles of management.

Hancocks has also become highly critical of keeping elephants in captivity, and states that their breeding programs only aim to replenish a depleting zoo elephant stock and do not contribute to elephant conservation. He notes that stereotypic activities in zoo elephants, such as monotonous pacing and repetitive swaying in zoo elephants is the result of small enclosed spaces with little to no opportunity to interact with or manipulate natural objects. He has been outspoken about his former employer, the Woodland Park Zoo's elephant enclosure in particular, stating that Seattle's climate and the enclosure's size are not conductive to a happy, healthy life in elephants. Hancocks is an advocate for sanctuaries in climates better suited to elephants, citing both the Performing Animal Welfare Society (PAWS) Sanctuary in California, and The Elephant Sanctuary in Hohenwald, Tennessee as examples of these.

== Publications ==
Animals and Architecture. 1971. Evelyn: London, and Praeger: New York

Master Builders of the Animal World. 1973. Evelyn: London, and Harper & Row: New York

An Animated Fun Fair? In, Survey of Animal Welfare. 1973. Animal Defence Society: London

Social Biology, Bioclimatic Zones, and the Comprehensive Master Plan for the Woodland Park Zoological Gardens. 1977. In, Applied Behavioral Research. Pica Press: Seattle

Animals in Circuses. 1979. Royal Society for the Prevention of Cruelty to Animals: London

75 Years: A History of Woodland Park Zoological Gardens. 1979. Parks and Recreation Department: Seattle

An Introduction to Reintroduction. 1995. In, Ethics on the Ark. Smithsonian Institution Press: Washington DC.

Lions and Tigers and Bears, Oh No! 1995. In, Ethics on the Ark. Smithsonian Institution Press: Washington DC.

Gardens of Ecology. 1996. In, Keepers of the Kingdom. Thomasson-Grant: Charlottesville

Design and Use of Moats and Barriers. 1996. In, Wild Mammals in Captivity. University of Chicago

Is There a Place in the World for Zoos? 2001. In, State of the Animals. Humane Society Press: Washington DC.

A Different Nature: The Paradoxical World of Zoos, and Their Uncertain Future. 2001. University of California Press. (Finalist in the Los Angeles Times Book Prize for Science, 2001.)

Zoo Animals as Entertainment Exhibitions, 2007. In, A Cultural History of Animals in the Modern Age. Bloomsbury: Oxford

Most Zoos Do Not Deserve Elephants. 2008. In, Elephants and Ethics: Towards a Morality of Existence. Johns Hopkins University

An Elephant in the Room: The Science and Well-Being of Elephants in Captivity. 2009. Co-editor with Debra L. Forthman, Lisa F. Kane, and Paul F. Waldau. Tufts University

Optimal Conditions for Captive Elephants. 2009. Co-author with Debra L. Forthman and Lisa F. Kane. In, An Elephant in the Room; The Science and Well-Being of Elephants in Captivity. Tufts University

Best Practices, by the Coalition for Captive Elephant Well-Being. 2009. Co-author, and co-editor with Debra L. Forthman and Lisa F. Kane. In, An Elephant in the Room; The Science and Well-Being of Elephants in Captivity. Tufts University

The History and Principles of Zoo Exhibition. 2010. In, Wild Mammals in Captivity, second edition. University of Chicago
