= Bobo (gorilla) =

Zoo gorilla (1951-1968)

Coordinates: 47°39′39.5″N 122°18′35.2″W

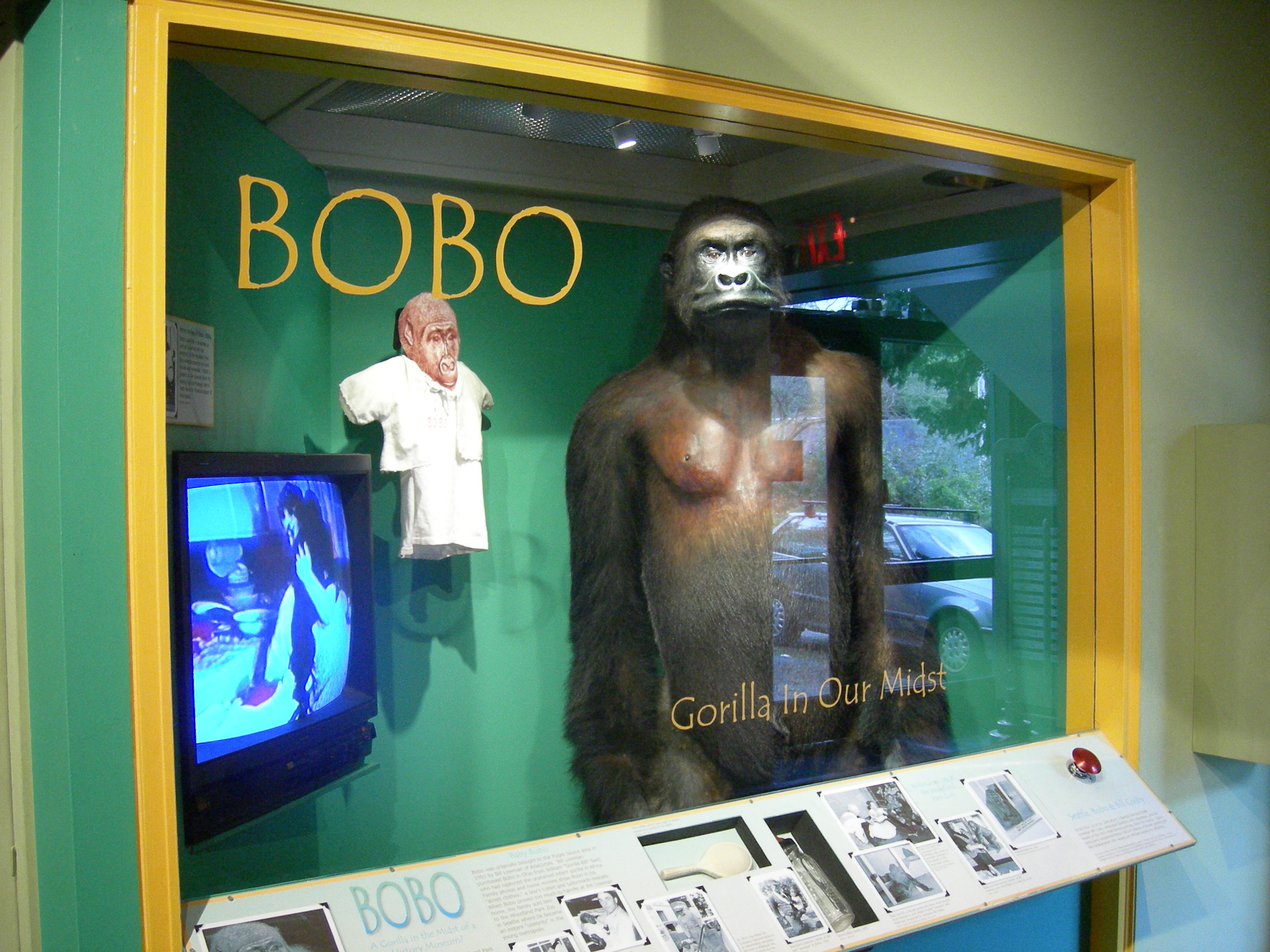
- Bobo, taxidermically stuffed at Seattle's Museum of History and Industry
- Species: Western lowland gorilla (Gorilla gorilla gorilla)
- Sex: Male
- Born: c. 1951
- Died: February 22, 1968 (aged 16–17); Woodland Park Zoo, Seattle, Washington, USA
- Cause of death: Pulmonary embolism
- Residence: Woodland Park Zoo, Seattle, Washington, USA
- Mate: Fifi

Bobo (1951–1968) was a western lowland gorilla (Gorilla gorilla gorilla) who was a prominent feature of Woodland Park Zoo in Seattle, Washington, United States, from 1953 until his early death at 17 (less than half his normal lifespan). As a publicly accessible gorilla in the wake of King Kong, Bobo was Seattle's most prominent attraction before the construction of the Space Needle and the introduction of professional sports to the city. After his death, Bobo's skin was stuffed and placed on display at Seattle's Museum of History and Industry. The remainder of his body was turned over to the University of Washington's Burke Museum of Natural History and Culture for research purposes; however, the skull went missing shortly after his autopsy and wasn't reunited with the rest of the skeleton until 2007.

== Life ==
Bobo was born in French Equatorial Africa sometime in 1951. When Bobo was approximately 2 weeks old, William "Gorilla Bill" Said captured him after killing the gorilla's mother, an acceptable and even admired practice at the time. Bobo was the youngest gorilla ever captured at the time, and no zoo wanted to buy him. Said took Bobo back to his home in Columbus, Ohio, USA, where Said's mother looked after the infant ape. Several months later, Bill Lowman, a fisherman from Washington state, purchased Bobo from Said while looking for a chimpanzee as a present for his parents, Raymond and Jean Lowman. Bill enlisted his aunt to drive Bobo to the Lowman family home in Anacortes, a town on Fidalgo Island in Skagit County.

Bobo was brought to Anacortes and lived in the Lowman family home. He quickly became a tourist attraction when word got around that a family had a gorilla living in their home. Over the next two years, the Lowmans raised Bobo as if he were a human until his size and strength posed issues too serious to ignore. Jean Lowman kept detailed accounts of the destruction Bobo wrought on their house and possessions. The Lowmans decided they could no longer take care of Bobo in their home, and sold him to the Woodland Park Zoo in Seattle in 1953.

At the zoo, Bobo became a big tourist attraction. The zoo was able to use the publicity surrounding Bobo to garner public support for a new primate house. While at the zoo, Bobo never forgot about the Lowmans, instantly recognizing any of them when they came to visit. In 1956, the zoo introduced a female gorilla named Fifi to Bobo's cage in the hopes that they would mate. Although Fifi remained with Bobo until his death, they never mated, which perplexed zookeepers and the media who followed them.

== Death and legacy ==
Bobo was found dead in his cage on February 22, 1968. The cause of death has remained a source of controversy, with the autopsy officially attributing the death to pulmonary embolism. After the autopsy his pelt was removed, mounted, and placed on display at the Museum of History and Industry (MOHAI) several months later. The rest of the remains, meanwhile, were turned over to the Burke Museum to be used for research purposes; the Burke owns the remains to the present day.

Bobo's mounted pelt has remained on display at MOHAI except for a brief stint between 1987–1991 when it was displayed at the Anacortes Museum. The pelt was then removed from display in 1997 and placed into storage due to its deteriorating condition and was restored by the original taxidermist in 2000 before being put back on display,. Bobo was again taken off display when MOHAI moved to a new location in South Lake Union in December 2012.

=== Controversy over Merrill Spencer's ownership of Bobo's skull ===
Shortly after the remains were transferred to the Burke Museum, a University of Washington graduate student discovered that Bobo's head was missing. As a result, the museum indefinitely postponed skeletonization—the process of separating flesh from bone—as an incomplete skeleton was of little educational value. However, in 1975, the failure of the Burke's storage freezer in which the remains were stored made skeletonization immediately necessary.

In 1978, Daris Swindler, the Burke Museum director, was told that the skull may be in the possession of Merrill Spencer, a physician who had attended Bobo's autopsy. Then in 1981 Spencer allowed David Humphries, a writer for the Seattle Weekly, to take a picture of Bobo's skull. However, when asked by Humphries, Spencer refused to give the skull to the Burke. After Spencer's death in 2006, his employees decided to reunite Bobo's skull with the rest of the skeleton, and after some negotiating, the skull was given to the Burke in 2007.

== See also ==
- List of individual apes
