= Immersion exhibit =

Zoo enclosure

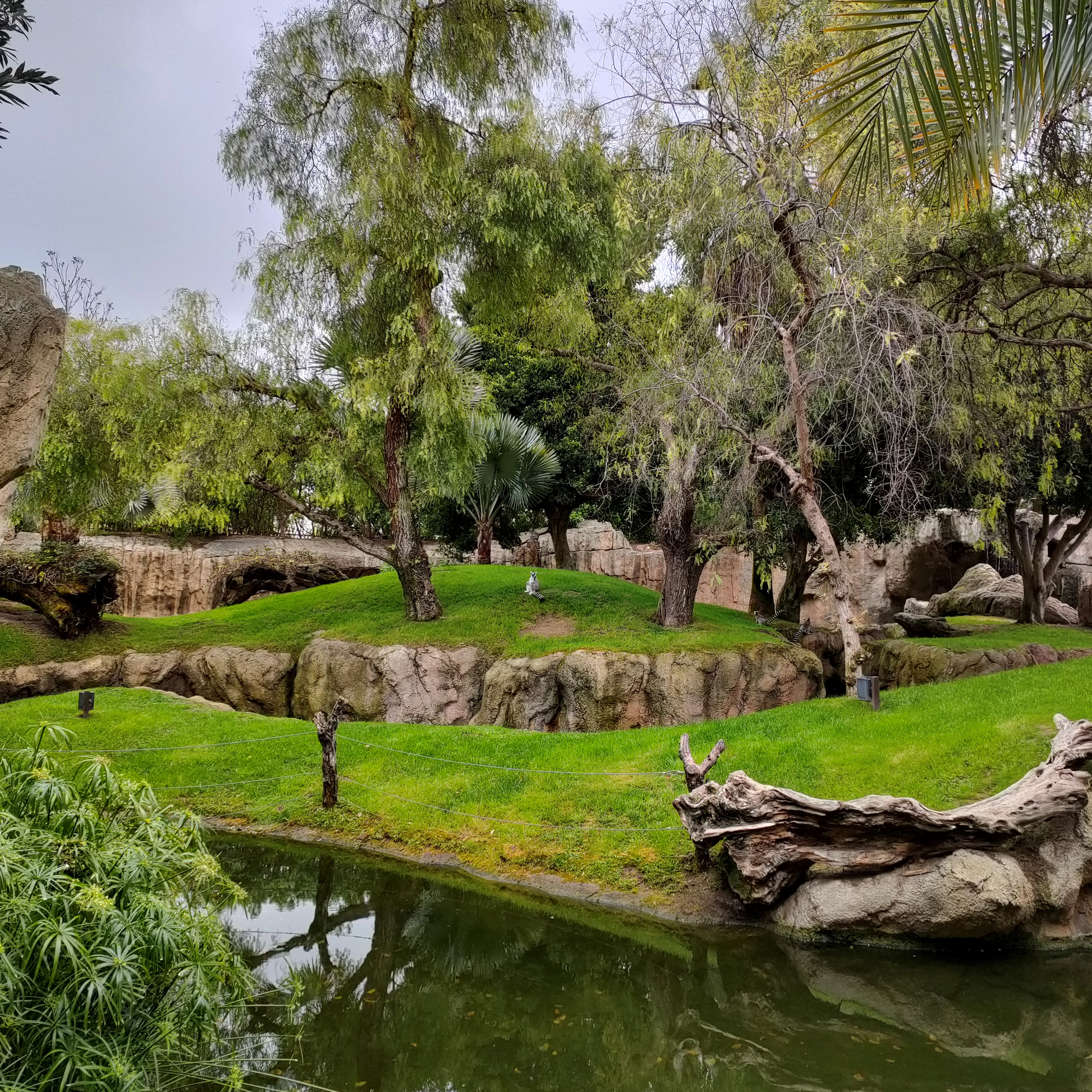
Immersion Exhibit in Bioparc València

An immersion exhibit is a naturalistic zoo environment that gives visitors the sense of being in the animals' habitats. Buildings and barriers are hidden. By recreating sights and other sensorial input from natural environments, immersion exhibits provide an indication about how animals live in the wild.

The landscape immersion term and approach were developed in 1975 through the efforts of David Hancocks at Seattle's Woodland Park Zoo. This led to the zoo's ground-breaking gorilla exhibit, which opened in 1978. The concept became the industry standard by the 1980s, and has since gained widespread acceptance as the best practice for zoological exhibits.
