= Woodland Park Zoo =

Zoo in Seattle, Washington, United States

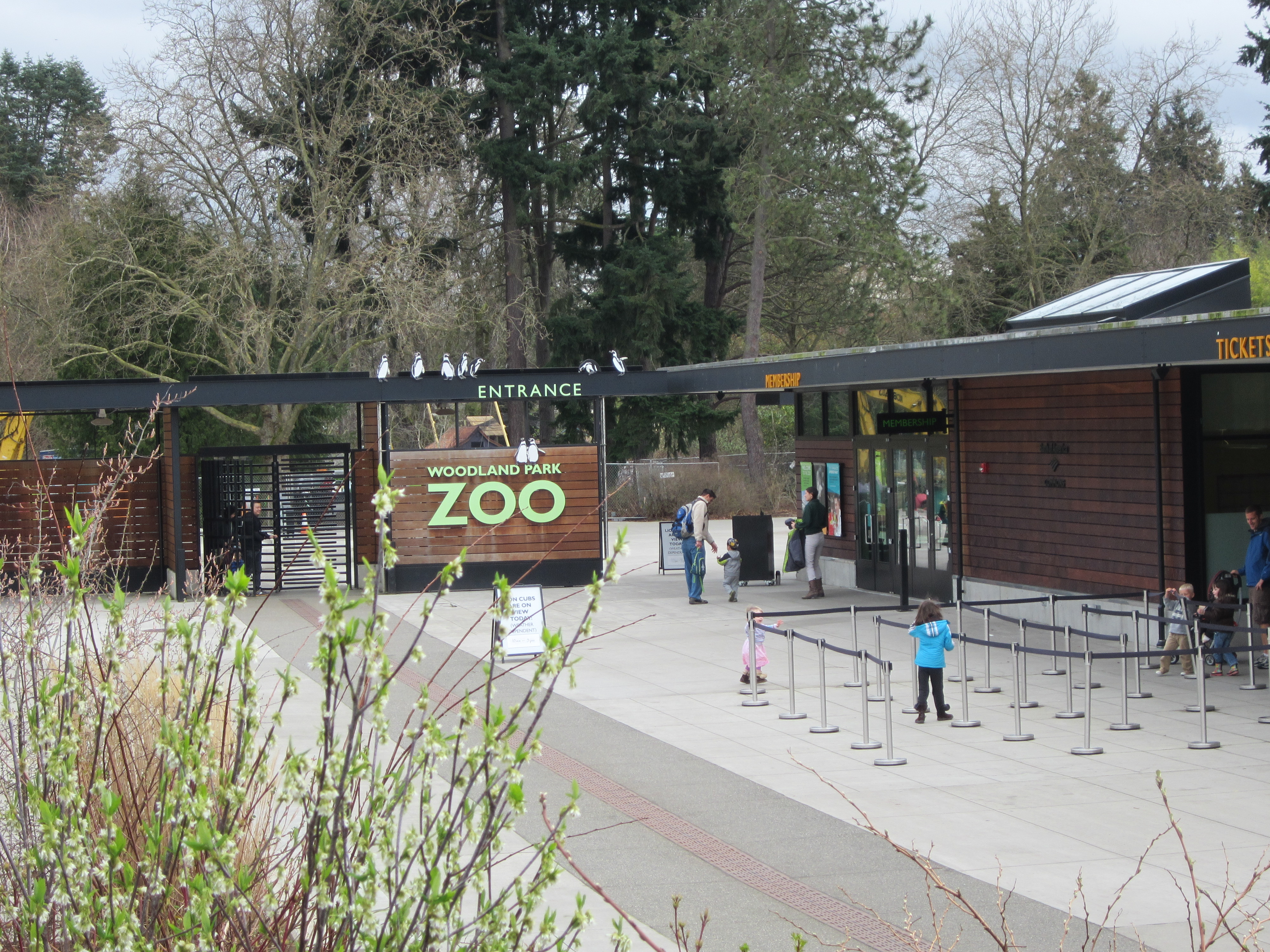
- Main entrance
- Interactive map of Woodland Park Zoo
- 47.66834°N 122.34984°W
- Date opened: 1899; 127 years ago
- Location: Woodland Park, Seattle, Washington, U.S.
- Land area: 92 acres (37 ha)
- No. of animals: 900
- No. of species: 250
- Annual visitors: 1+ million
- Memberships: AZA
- Major exhibits: Trail of Vines, Northern Trail, Tropical Rain Forest, Banyan Wilds, African Savanna, Australasia
- Website: www.zoo.org

Woodland Park Zoo is a wildlife conservation organization and zoological garden located in the Phinney Ridge neighborhood of Seattle, Washington, United States. The zoo is the recipient of over 65 awards across multiple categories. The zoo has around 900 animals from 250 species and the zoo has over 1 million visitors a year.

== History ==
Historical video of Woodland Park, 1938

Occupying the western half of Woodland Park, the zoo began as a small menagerie on the estate of Guy C. Phinney, a Canadian-born lumber mill owner and real estate developer. Six years after Phinney's death, on December 28, 1899, Phinney's wife sold the 188-acre (76 ha) Woodland Park to the city for $5,000 in cash and the assumption of a $95,000 mortgage. The sum was so large that then-mayor W. D. Wood vetoed the acquisition, only to be later overruled by the city council. In 1902, the Olmsted Brothers firm of Boston was hired to design the city's parks, including Woodland Park, and the next year the collection of the private Leschi Park menagerie was moved to Phinney Ridge.

An expansion of the zoo was approved in 1968 as part of the Forward Thrust ballot measures and resulted in a master plan designed by architect George Bartholick, which included a lid over Aurora Avenue and new exhibits to the east in Woodland Park. The plan was opposed by local residents and rejected in a citywide ballot initiative in November 1974.

In 1975, David Hancocks, the then-director of the Woodland Park Zoo, redesigned the zoo's gorilla exhibit to form what became referred to as landscape immersion exhibits, in which animals would become immersed in landscapes that represented their natural habitats as closely as possible, while visitors would also be immersed in the same replicated habitat. The habitat was designed with natural plants and rockwork, with special consideration being put towards the acoustic treatment of the exhibit to make the environment soft and quiet. Initially the idea was heavily criticized, with many experts being concerned about the maintenance of vegetation and lack of visibility, as well as the temperate environment of Washington negatively affecting the soil. The idea eventually became the standard for naturalistic exhibits, inspiring many imitators and replicas worldwide.

== Layout and features ==
As of the summer of 2010, the zoo featured 92 acres (37 ha) of exhibits, public spaces, parking, and playgrounds. Open to the public daily, it received 1.05 million visitors in 2006. Its collection includes:

- 1,090 animal specimens
- 300 animal species
- 35 endangered and 5 threatened animal species
- 7,000 trees
- 50,000+ shrubs and herbs
- 1,000+ plant species
- A sensory garden

== Exhibits ==
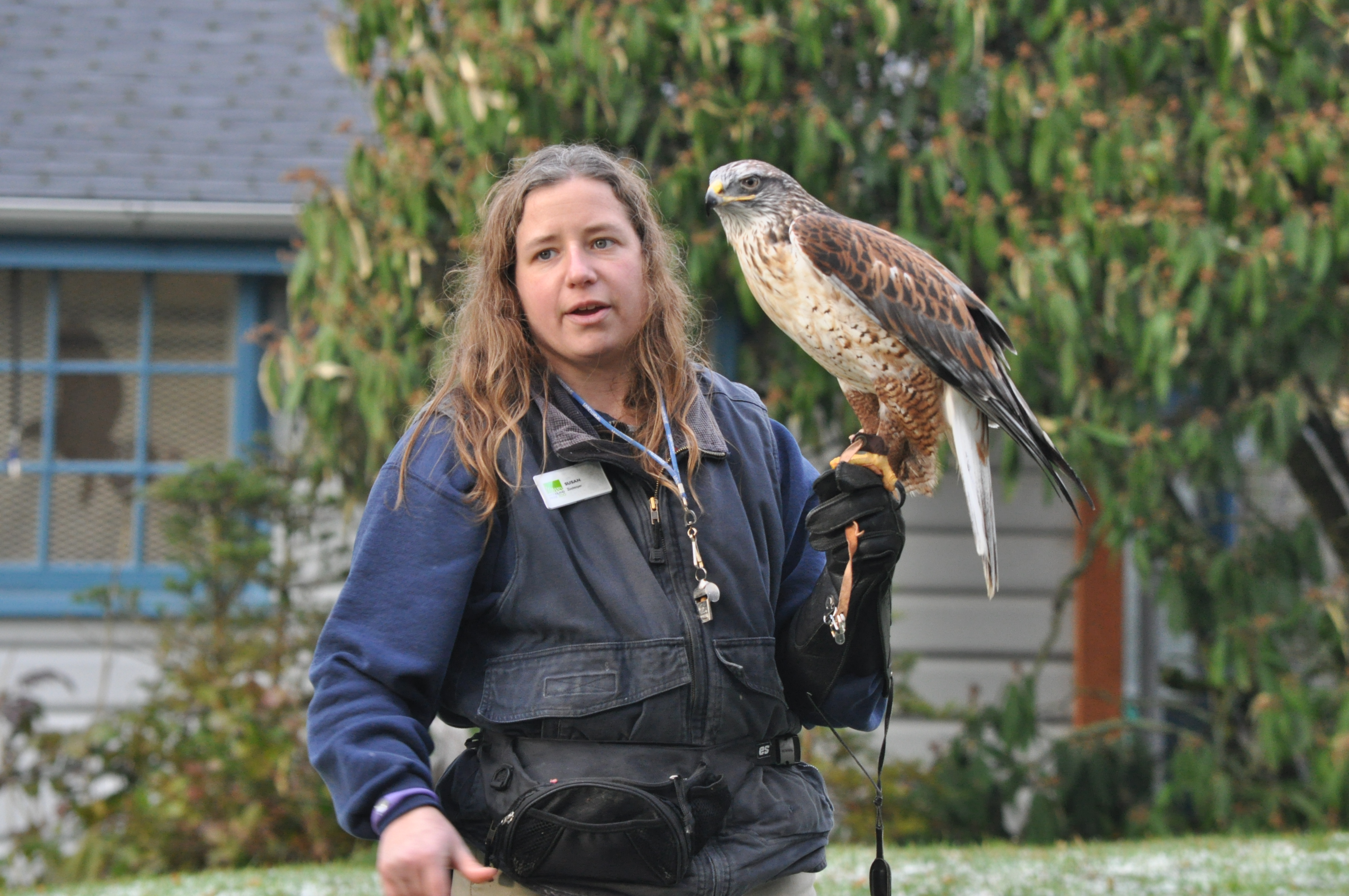
Ferruginous hawk (Buteo regalis) with keeper

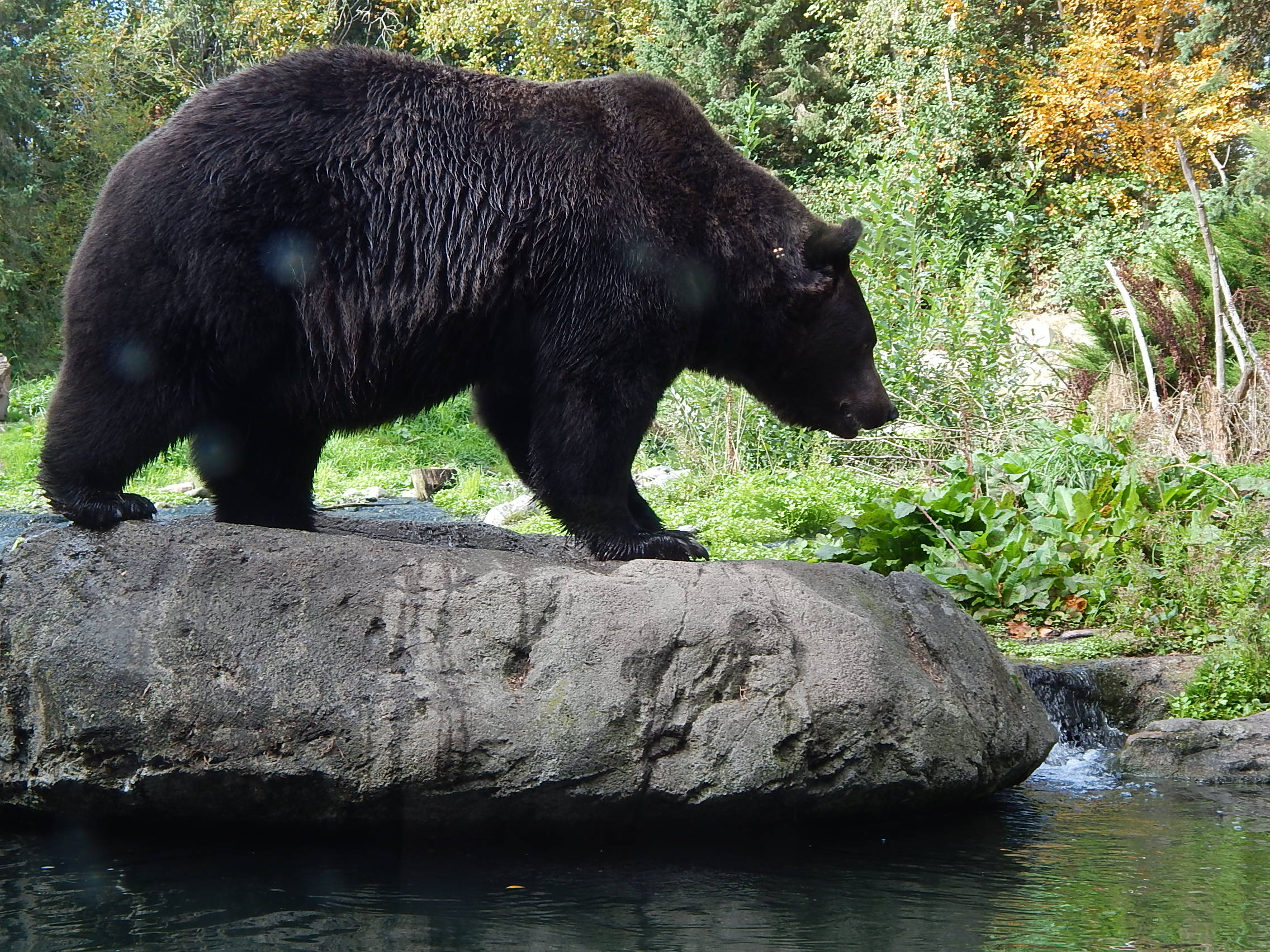
Brown bear in Northern Trail area

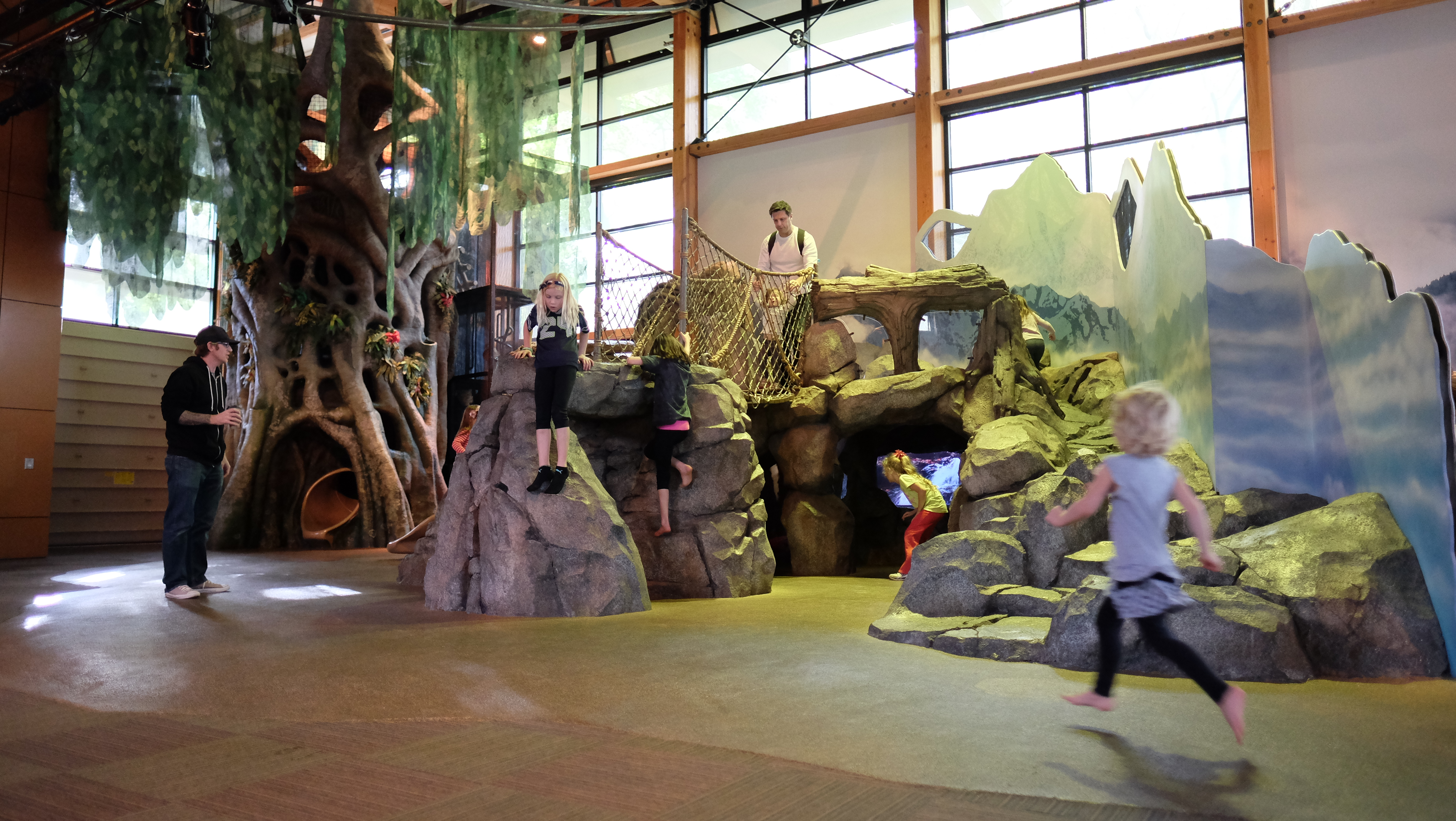
The Zoomazium play area for kids

Woodland Park Zoo is a recipient of several Best National Exhibit awards from the Association of Zoos and Aquariums, and ranks second after the Bronx Zoo in New York City for the number received. Woodland Park Zoo created what is generally considered the world's first immersion exhibit, a gorilla habitat, which opened in the late 1970s under the direction of zoo architect David Hancocks. Other exhibits include:

- Tropical Asia is the zoo's largest section, focusing on South and Southeast Asia, and is split into three areas. The first is Assam Rhino Reserve which is mostly composed of a large exhibit containing Glenn, the zoo's Indian rhinoceros. The second area is Banyan Wilds and is home to Malayan tigers, sloth bears, Asian small-clawed otters, and a small aviary. The third section is The Trail of Vines and houses orangutans, siamangs, pythons, and Malayan tapir. The Rhino Reserve was previously the Elephant Forest but was rethemed following the phasing out of the zoo's elephant program in April 2015, which opened for rhinoceros in May 2018.
- The African Savanna section houses animals native to the grasslands of Africa. The largest exhibit is an area for herbivores, home to reticulated and Rothschild's giraffe, Burchell's zebra, and common ostrich. There are as well enclosures for African lion, common warthog, Patas monkey, spotted hyena and a small aviary for savanna birds. The area also contains a recreation of an East African village. The African Savanna won the AZA exhibit award in 1981.
- Australasia is home to the zoo's Australian species. There is an outdoor exhibit shared by emu, common wallaroo, and red-necked wallaby. Next to it is Willawong Station, housing several species of Australian parrot, which visitors may feed with a seed stick for a small fee. There is a snow leopard enclosure next door.
- The Living Northwest Trail habitat focuses upon the animals of the taiga of Northwestern America. Exhibits include grizzly bear, mountain goat, elk, River Otter, Steller's Sea Eagle, and wolf. This area is modeled off a real trail in Alaska's Denali National Park and won the AZA Exhibit Award in 1995.
- Tropical Rainforest explores the animals of South America and Africa's jungles. The South American section has a jaguar exhibit. The African section contains western lowland gorillas, ring-tailed lemurs, red ruffed lemurs, and colobus monkeys. Tropical Rainforest was the recipient of the AZA Exhibit Award in 1993.
- Temperate Forest showcases creatures of the world's temperate woodlands. Exhibits include southern pudu, red panda, Chilean flamingo Red-crowned cranes, White-naped cranes, Maned wolves, a wetlands area, and a conservation aviary for rare birds. There is also a Bug House, home to the zoo's Partula Snails and a farm exhibit, allowing guests to pet domesticated animals such as Kunekune pigs, Sheep, Goats, and Miniature Jersey Steer.
- The penguin enclosure houses a colony of several dozen Humboldt penguins. The exhibit was remodeled in 2009 to allow underwater viewing of the birds and better theming to their natural habitat; it also now runs on green energy. The new penguin habitat received the AZA Top Honor Award in 2010.
- There is also a butterfly garden, a raptor center housing various birds of prey, and the Trail of Adaptations building that is home to Komodo dragon, and meerkat. Several species are kept offview from visitors including tree kangaroos and Indian Peafowl that roam freely around the Zoo Grounds.
- The zoo contains an indoor children's play area called Zoomazium, encouraging exploration, exercise, education, and fun for young children. An old-fashioned carousel retooled to run on solar energy is also featured. This merry-go-round (PTC #45) was first built by the Philadelphia Toboggan Company for the Cincinnati Zoo in 1918, it was refurbished and donated to Woodland Park Zoo by Alleniana Foundation.

== Community engagement ==
Woodland Park Zoo has been an active member of environmental and ecological conservation efforts across the U.S. Besides operating its own educational programs for school children, the park also cooperates with many of the higher education institutions in state, such as the University of Washington. On January 5, 2010, the zoo announced that due to the "difficult economy," it would be closing its Night Exhibit.

== Fundraisers ==
ZooTunes, a summer concert series, has been held at the zoo since 1983 and raises funds for various zoo programs and activities. For the event, the zoo's North Meadow is turned into an outdoor amphitheater that accommodates 3,700 attendees.

== Notable animals ==
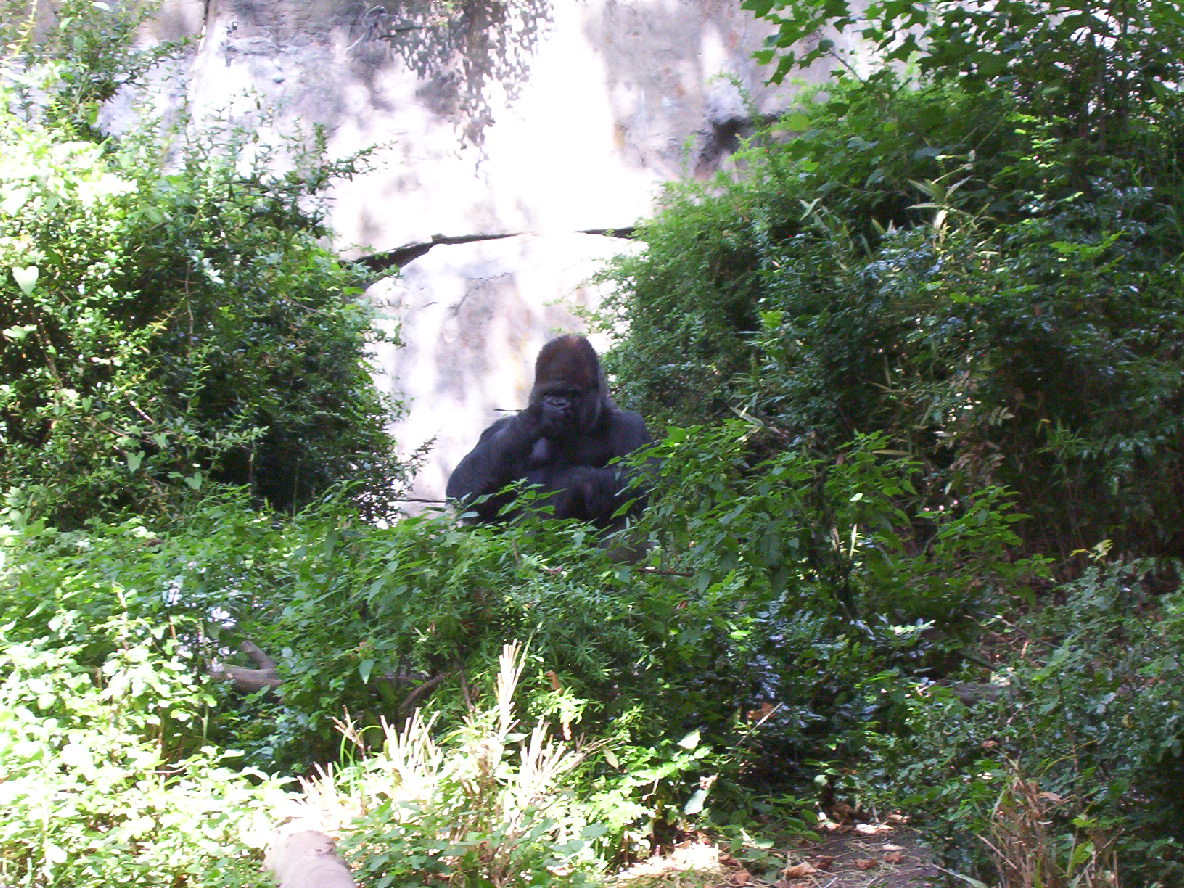
Bobo's successors live in a modern landscaped enclosure with glass panels that allow visitors to get up close without disturbing the gorillas.

From 1953 to 1968, Woodland Park Zoo was home to Bobo, a western lowland gorilla (Gorilla gorilla gorilla, the same species as the gorillas currently living at the zoo). Bobo was acquired from the Lowman family of Anacortes, Washington, who had purchased the gorilla as an infant from a hunter in Columbus, Ohio, in 1951 and had raised him in their family home in Anacortes. Bobo drew many visitors to the zoo and was one of Seattle's main attractions in the years preceding the construction of Seattle Center and the expansion of major-league professional sports into the city. His popularity is credited with helping the zoo obtain funding to build a new primate house.

Anthropologist Dawn Prince-Hughes spent many years working at Woodland Park Zoo and observing the western lowland gorillas there, which she wrote about in her book Songs of the Gorilla Nation: My Journey Through Autism.

Two lionesses named Busela (Seyla) and Nobuhle (Nabu) were transferred from the zoo to Hogle Zoo in Salt Lake City, Utah, to breed with the Montgomery Zoo's two male lions, Baron and Vulcan. On February 24, 2016, Nabu gave birth to two males, Brutus and Titus, and a female, Calliope. Baron fathered the three cubs.

In December 2015, a baby gorilla, Yola, was born at the zoo. She is the first child of Nadiri who was also born there.

On June 20, 2017, the baby giraffe Lulu was born, standing 5'7" and weighing 149 lbs. The daughter of Tufani and Dave, she is a mixture of the reticulated and South African giraffe subspecies. Her naming rights were auctioned off at the zoo's Jungle Safari Party fundraiser. A male snow leopard cub was also born at the zoo that summer; he was given the name of Aibeck, meaning "long life" in Kyrgyz.

In July and October 2022 two brown bear cubs, Juniper and Fern, were transferred to the zoo from Alaska and Montana respectively. Both bears are female and were orphaned as young cubs.

The last two Asian elephants at the zoo, Bamboo and Chai, moved to the Oklahoma City Zoo in 2015. Both have since died. In September 2024, Guadalupe, the last Hippopotamus at the zoo, moved to the San Diego Zoo.

== Conservation ==
The Woodland Park Zoo works in collaboration with the Oregon Zoo, government agencies such as the U.S. Fish and Wildlife Service (USFWS), and conservation organizations on recovery projects for many threatened and endangered species, such as the Oregon silverspot butterfly, and western pond turtle.

== Gallery ==
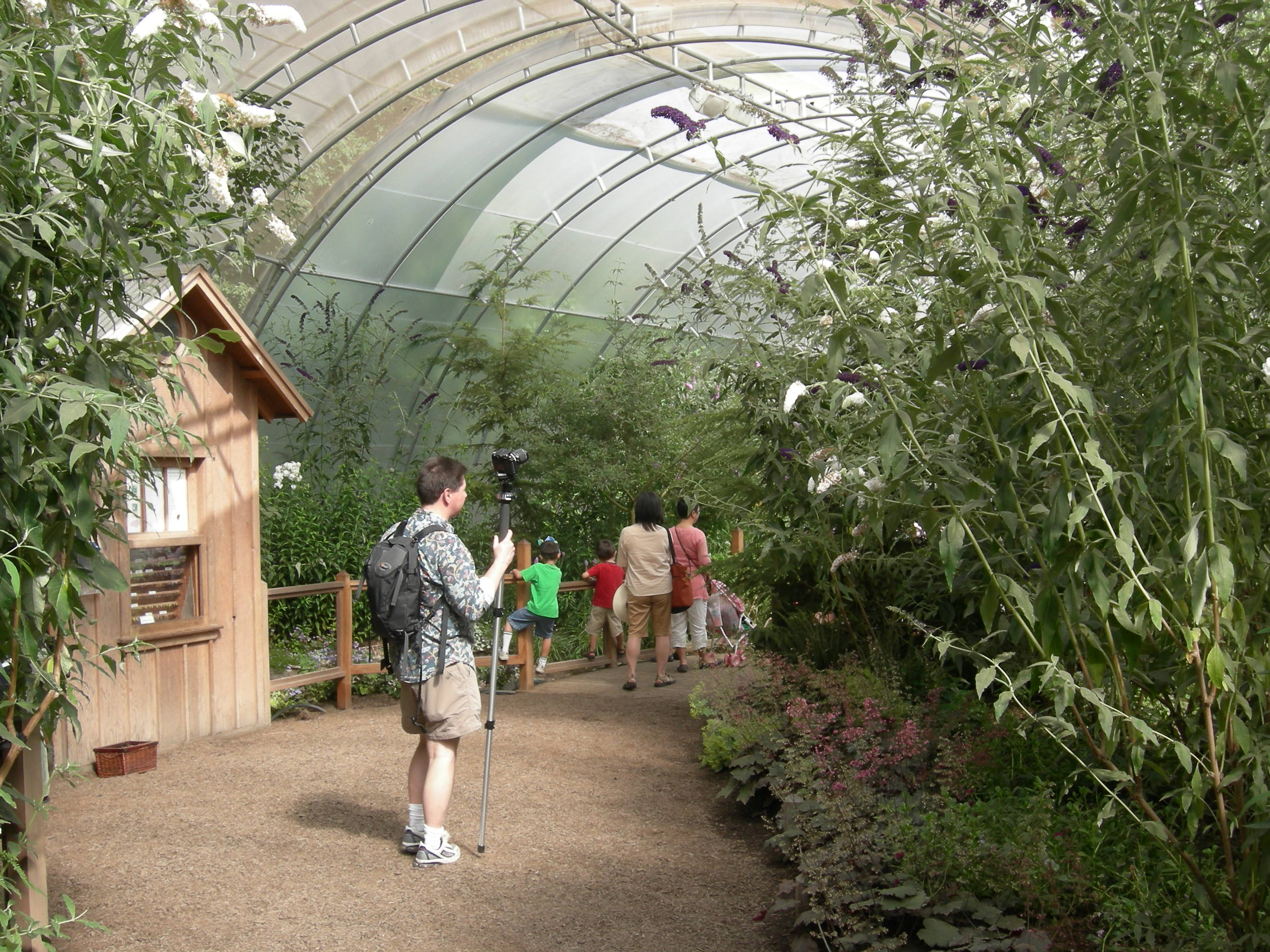
Butterflies and Blooms exhibit

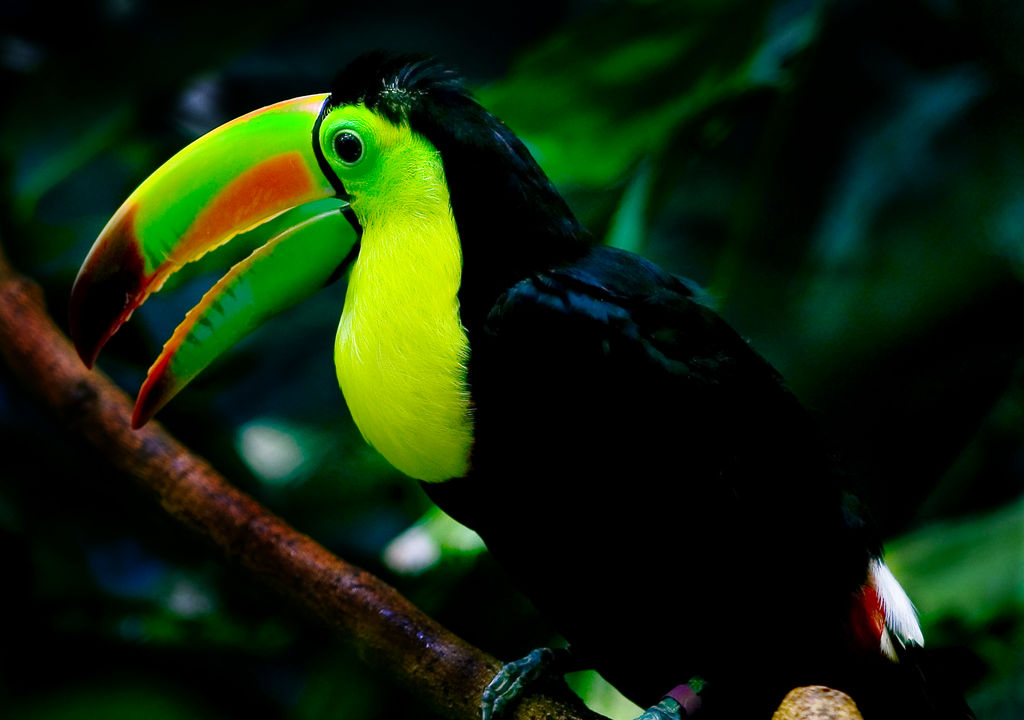
Keel-billed toucan at the Tropical Rain Forest exhibit

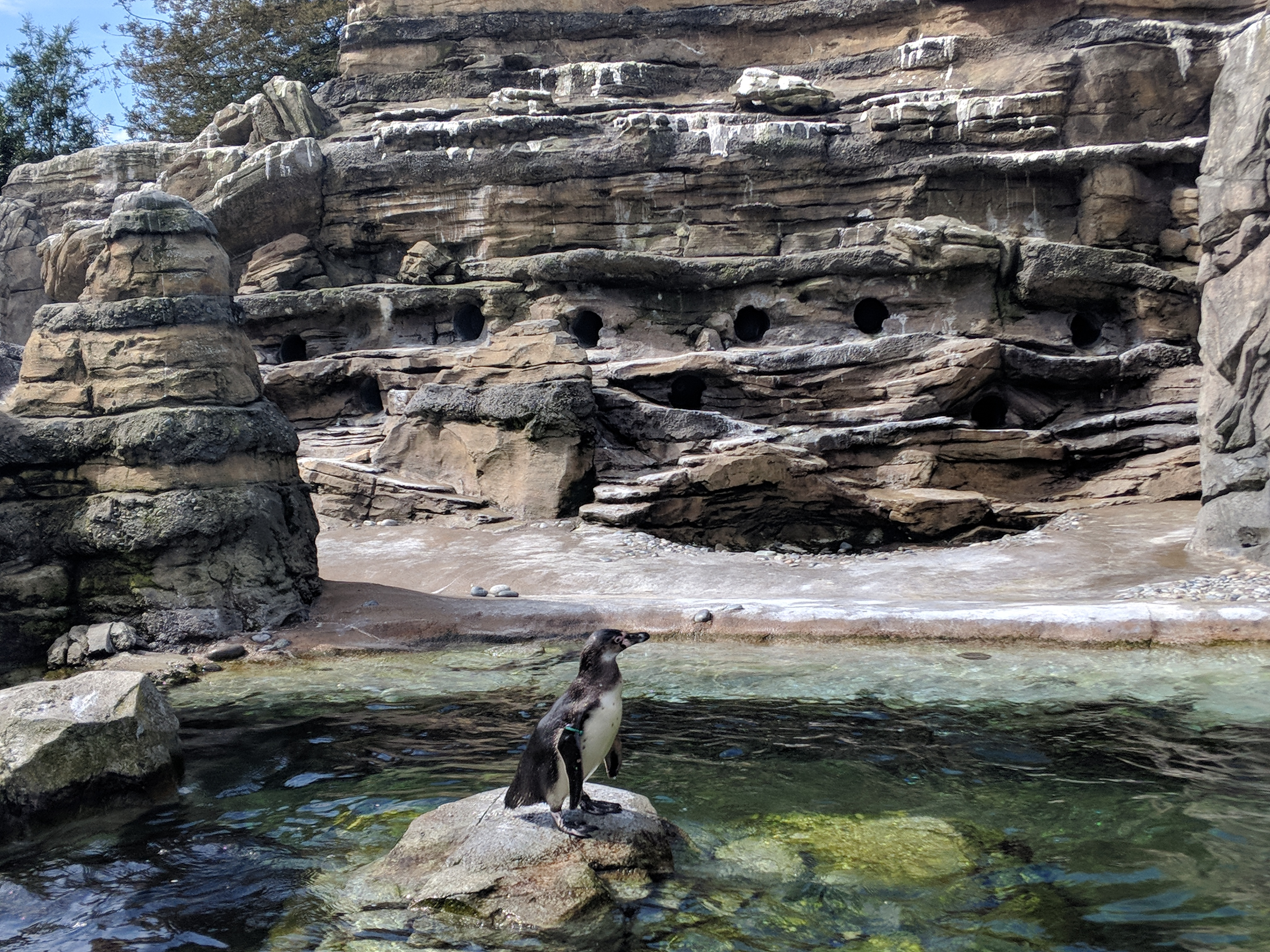
Humbolt penguin

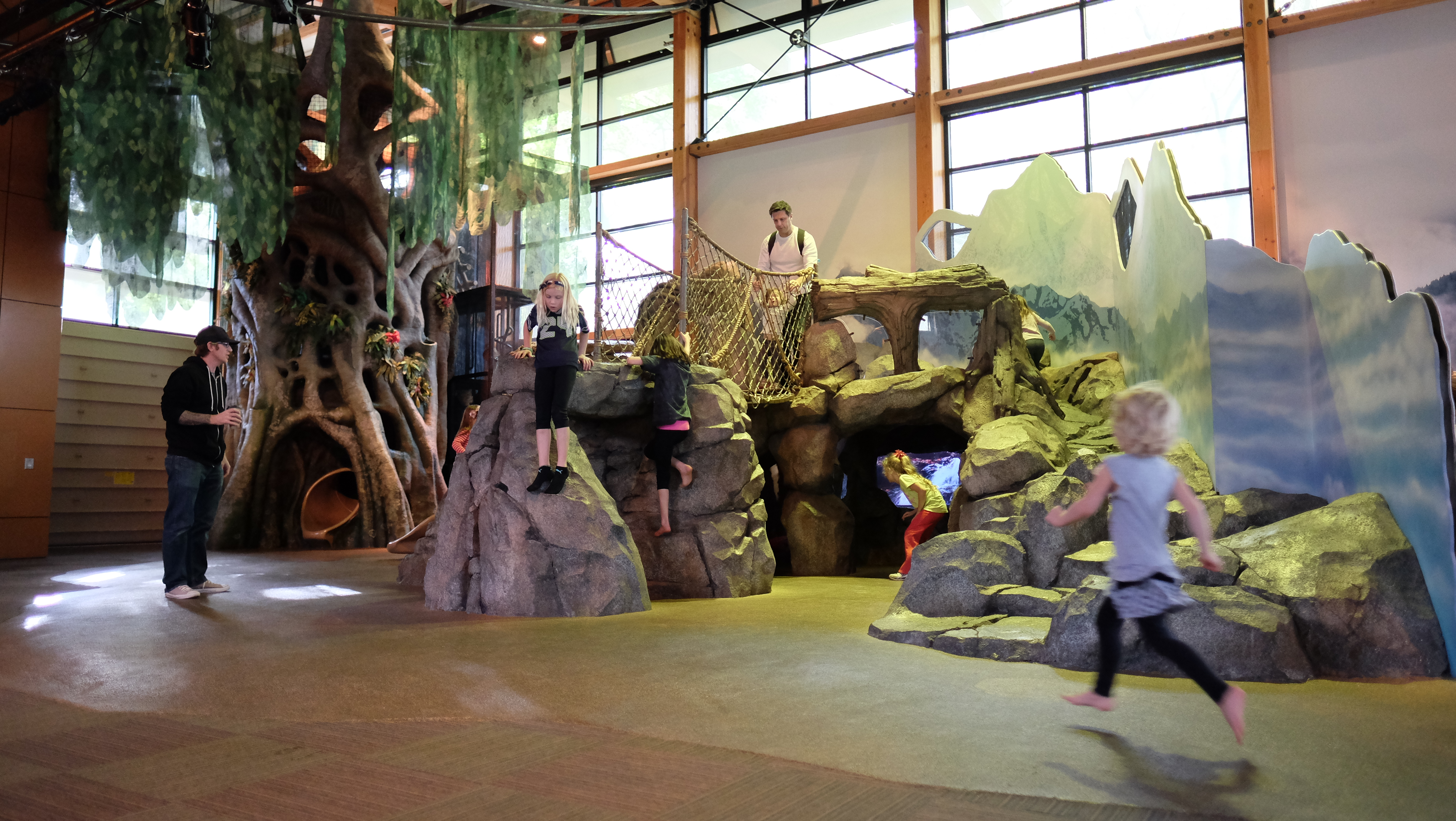
Zoomazium

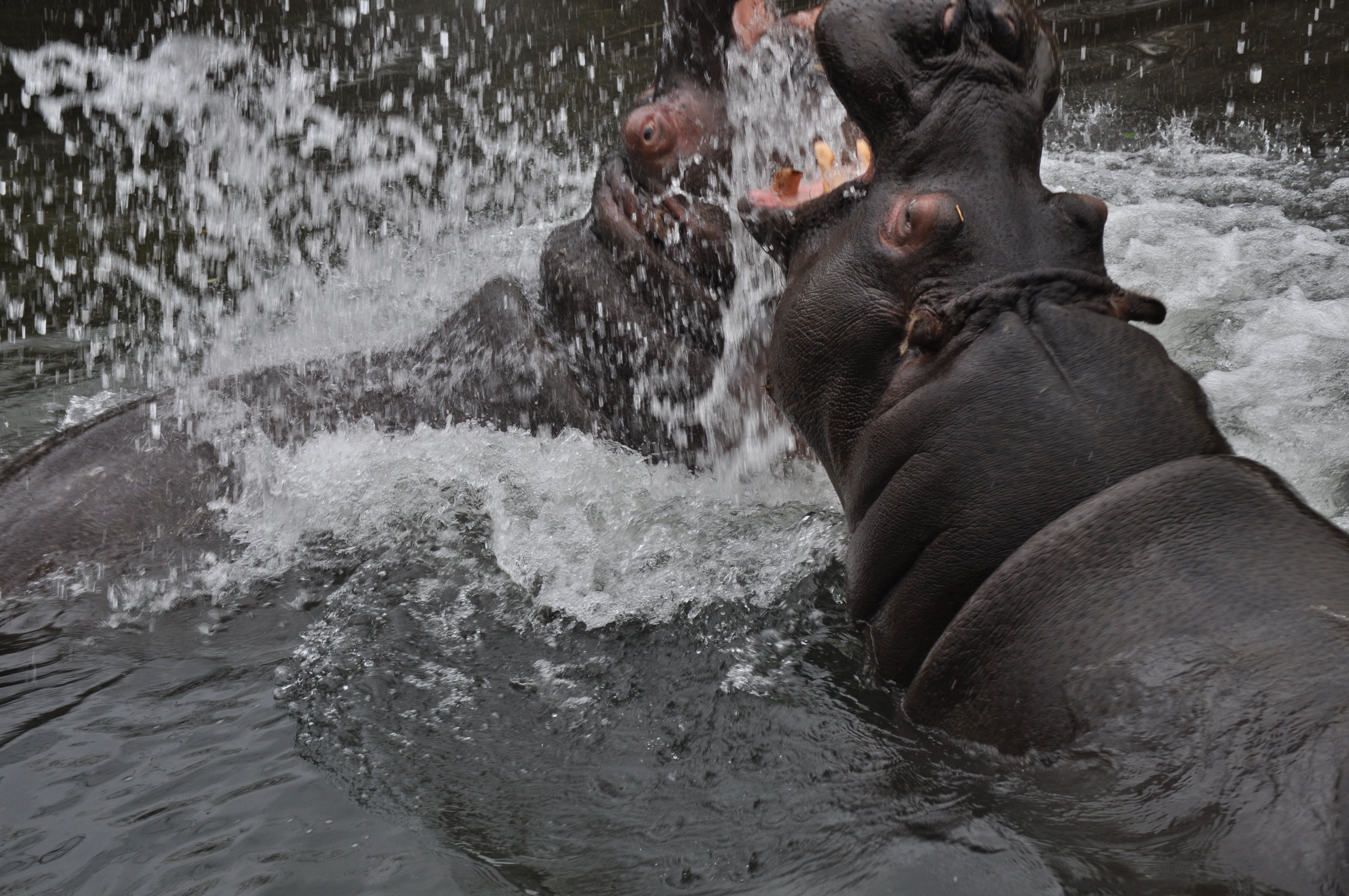
Hippos

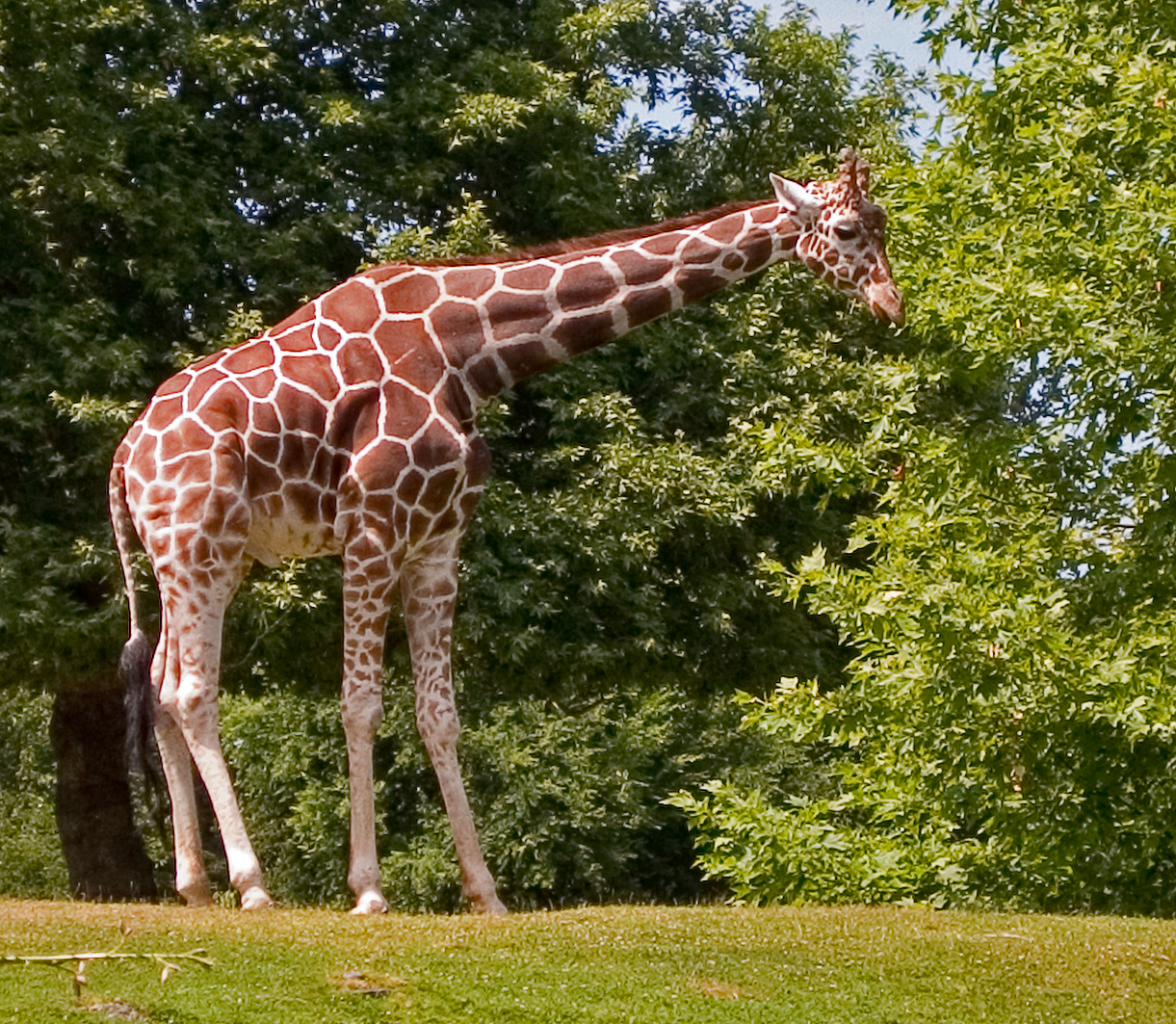
Reticulated giraffe

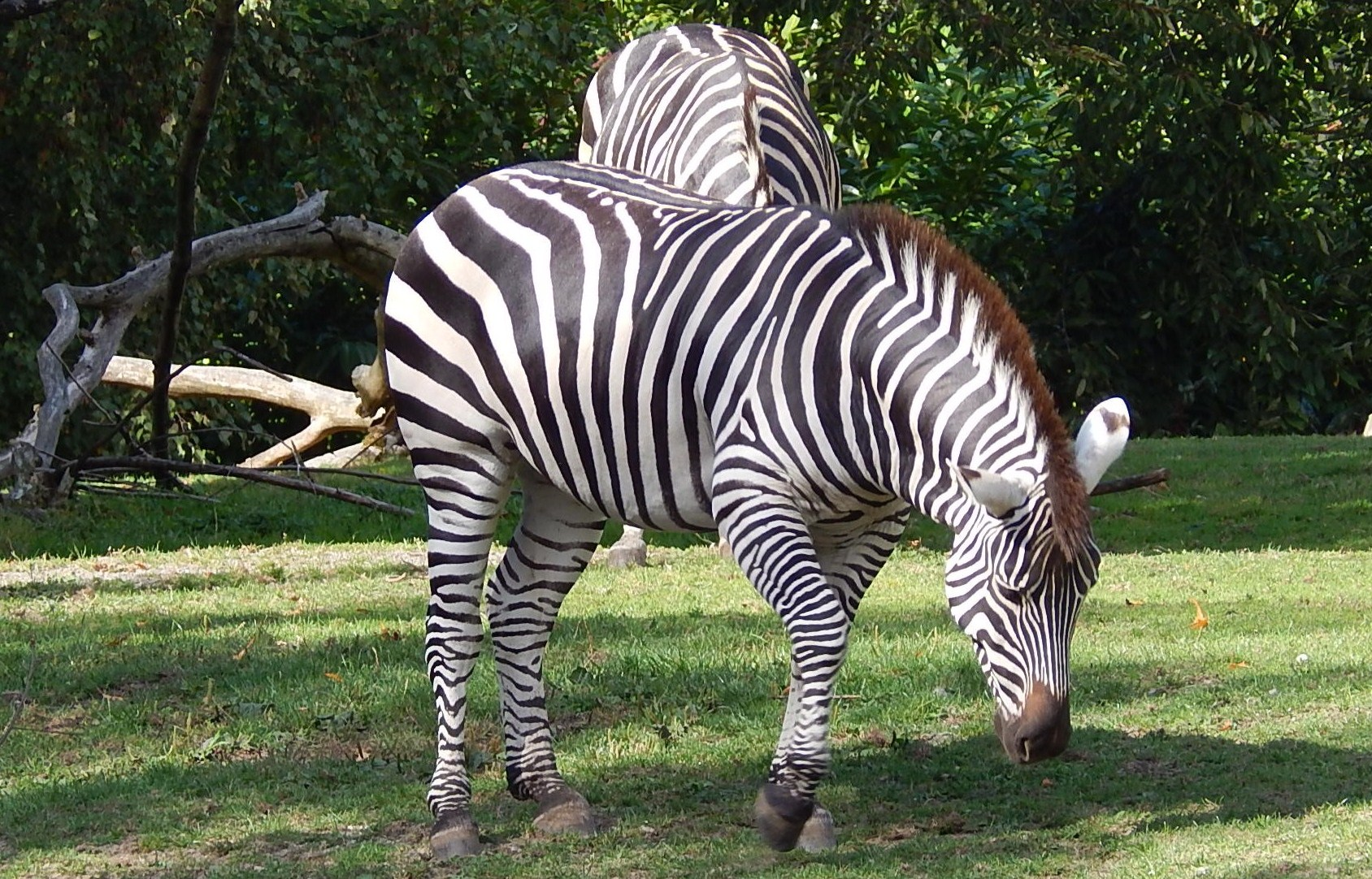
Burchell's zebras

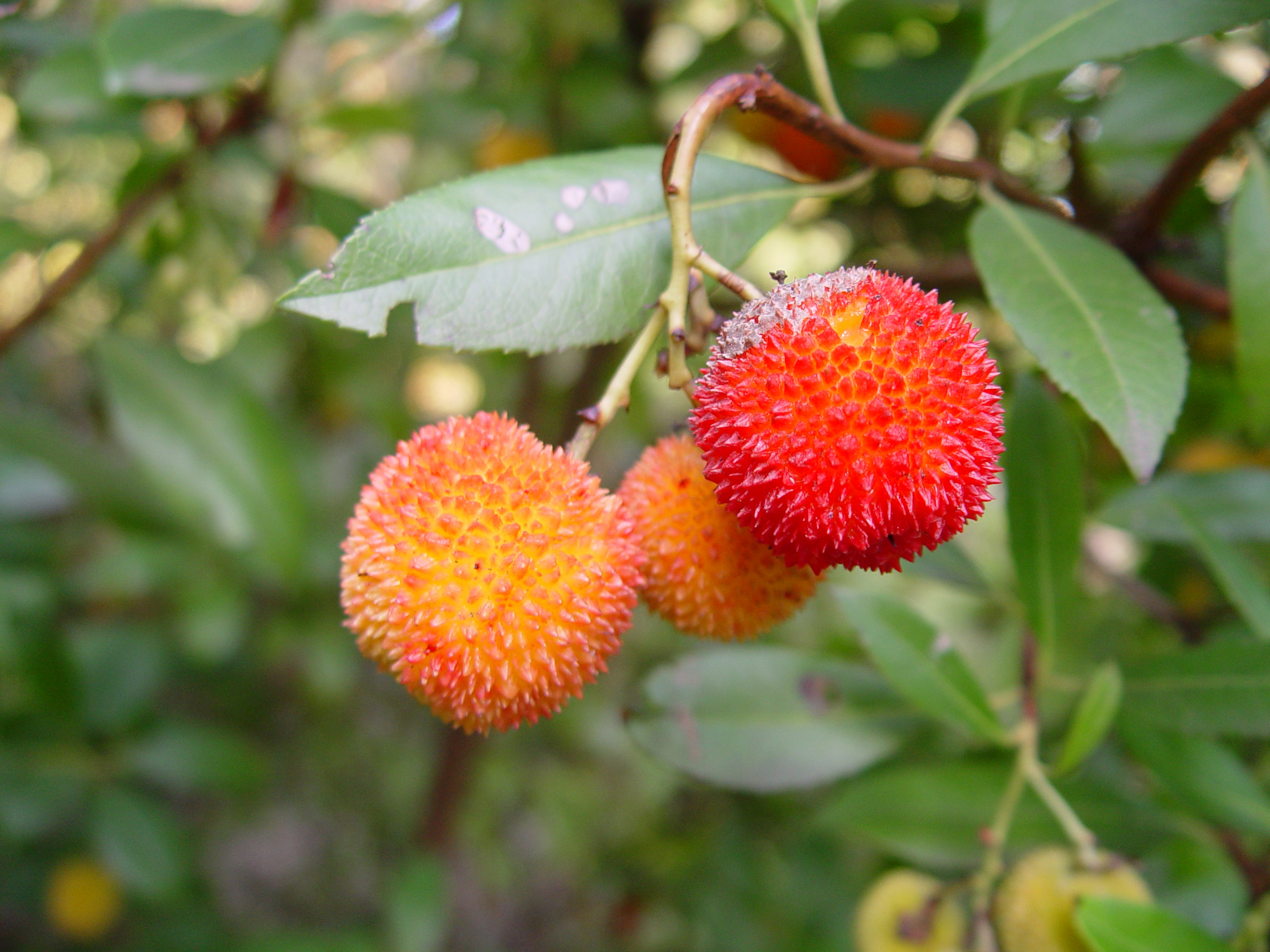
Strawberry tree

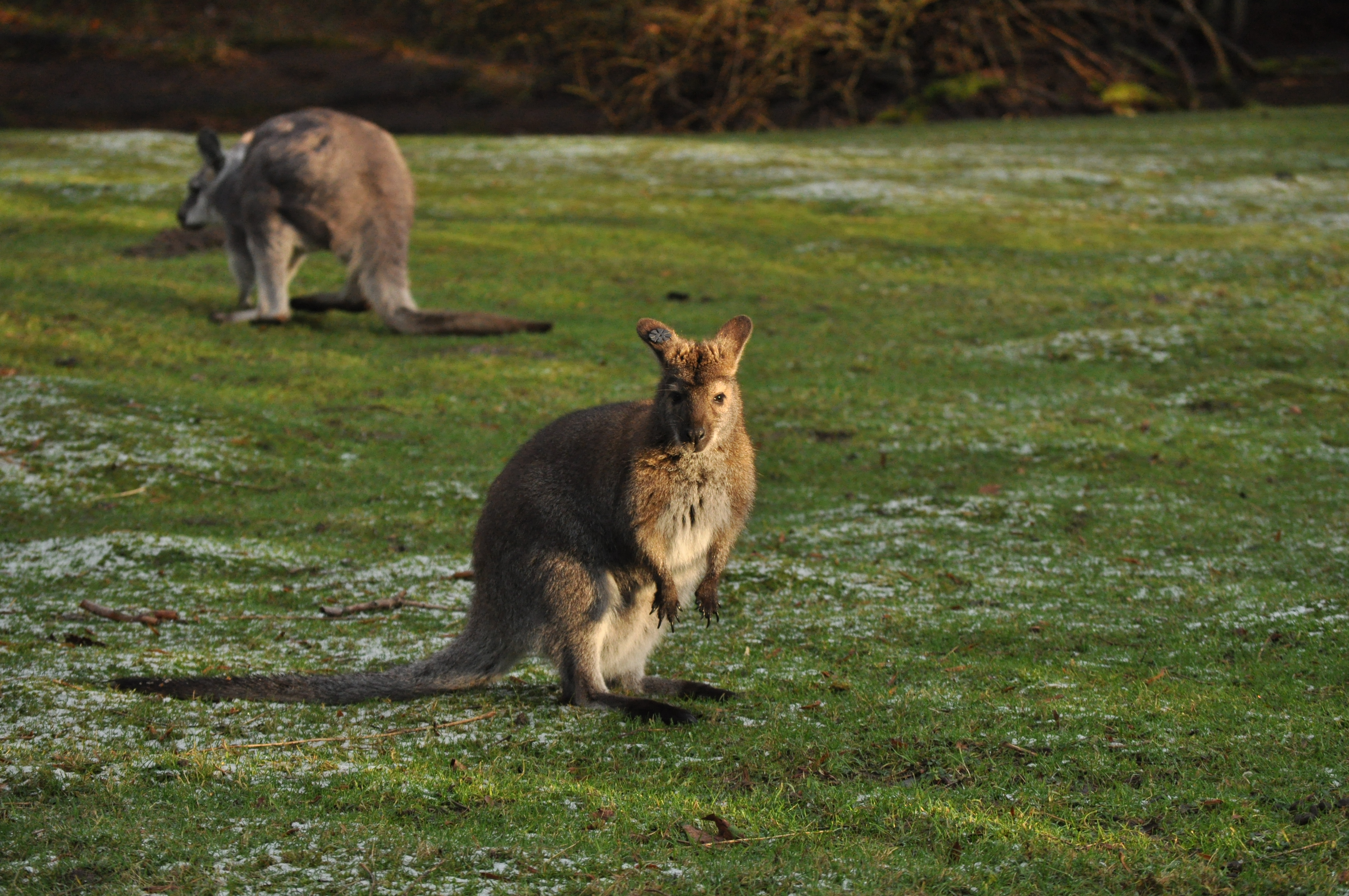
Red-necked wallaby

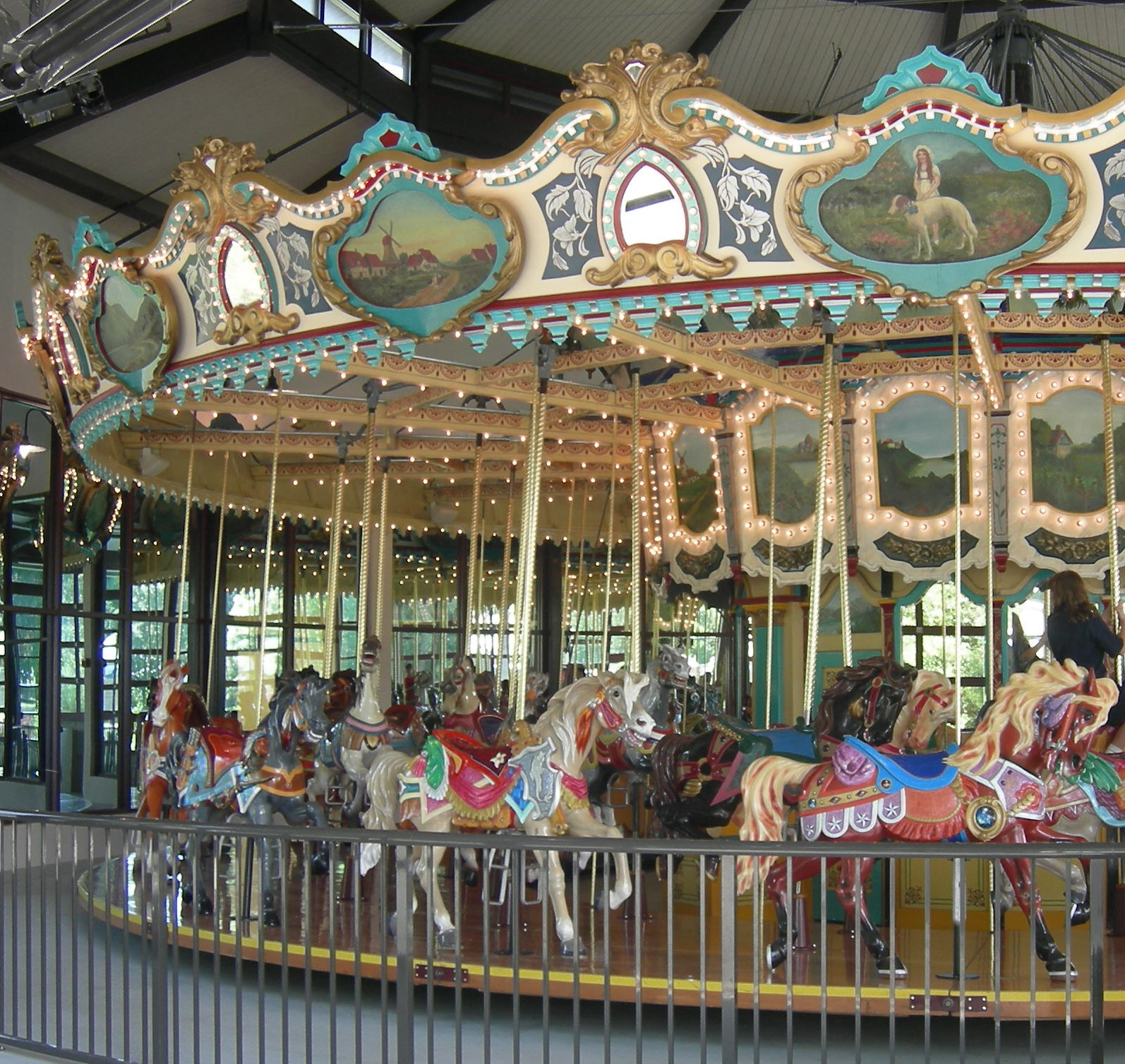
Carousel

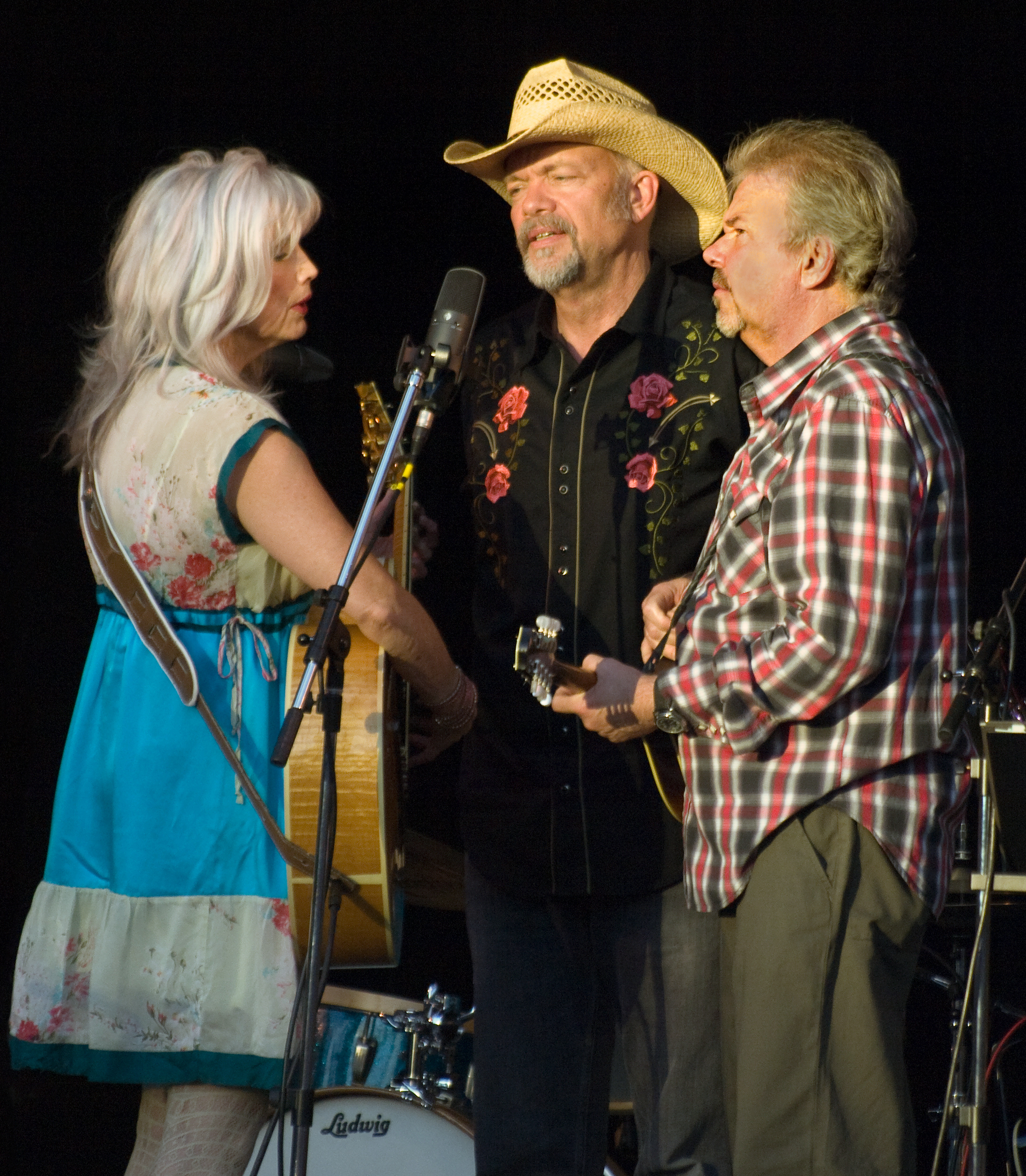
Many different performances are held at the zoo.
