= List of public art in Vancouver, Washington =

List of public artworks in Vancouver, Washington, U.S.

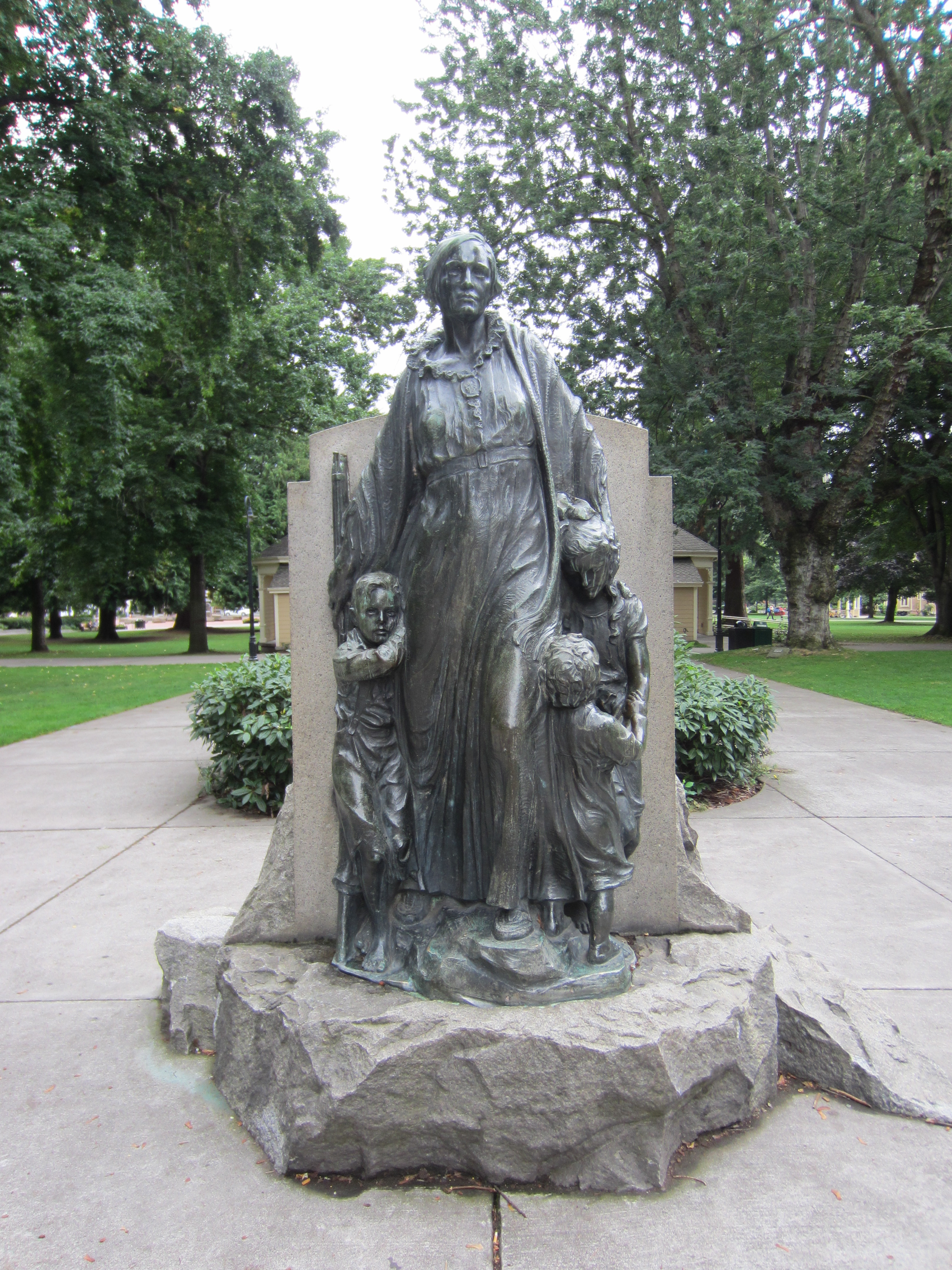
The Pioneer Mother Memorial, 2013

The following public artworks are installed in Vancouver, Washington, United States:

- Blue Messenger, George Batho
- Boat of Discovery, Jay Rood
- Captain George Vancouver, Jim Demetro
- Child with Fish
- Clark County Veterans War Memorial
- Firsts Monument
- Flying Umbrellas, Cobalt Designworks
- A Gift for You, Jim Demetro
- Glyph Singer, James Lee Hansen
- Heart & Stone, Cobalt Designworks
- Ilchee Plaza, Eric Jensen
- Monument to the Three Kichis
- Movie Madness, Paul Springer
- Napoleon Light Field Cannons
- Phoenix, Andrew Carson
- Phrogy
- The Pioneer Mother Memorial, Avard Fairbanks
- Salmon Run Bell Tower
- South Main Landmark, Jim Walsh
- Spike Flower, Manuel Izquierdo
- Vancouver Housing Authority Clock, The Verdin Company
- The Visitor, Matthew Dockrey
- Wendy Rose, Women Who Weld & Cobalt Designworks
- Wheel Series, Don Wilson
- Winged Woman, Beth Heron
