= John L. Morrison (disambiguation) =

John L. Morrison was the founder of the controversial Duluth, Minnesota newspaper Ripsaw.

John L. Morrison may also refer to:

- John L. Morrison (pioneer) (1819–1899), namesake of Morrison Street in Portland, Oregon
- John Lowrie Morrison (born 1948), Scottish artist
