= Pioneer Mother =

Pioneer Mother may refer to:

- The Pioneer Mother (Eugene, Oregon), an outdoor sculpture by Alexander Phimister Proctor, installed in Eugene, Oregon
- Pioneer Mother (Grafly), an outdoor sculpture in Golden Gate Park, San Francisco, California
- The Pioneer Mother Memorial, an outdoor 1928 memorial sculpture by Avard Fairbanks, installed in Vancouver, Washington
- Madonna of the Trail, statues located in 12 different states
- Pioneer Woman statue of pioneer mother and son in Ponca City, Oklahoma
