= Salmon Run Bell Tower =

Bell tower and a 35 bell glockenspiel in Vancouver, Washington, U.S.

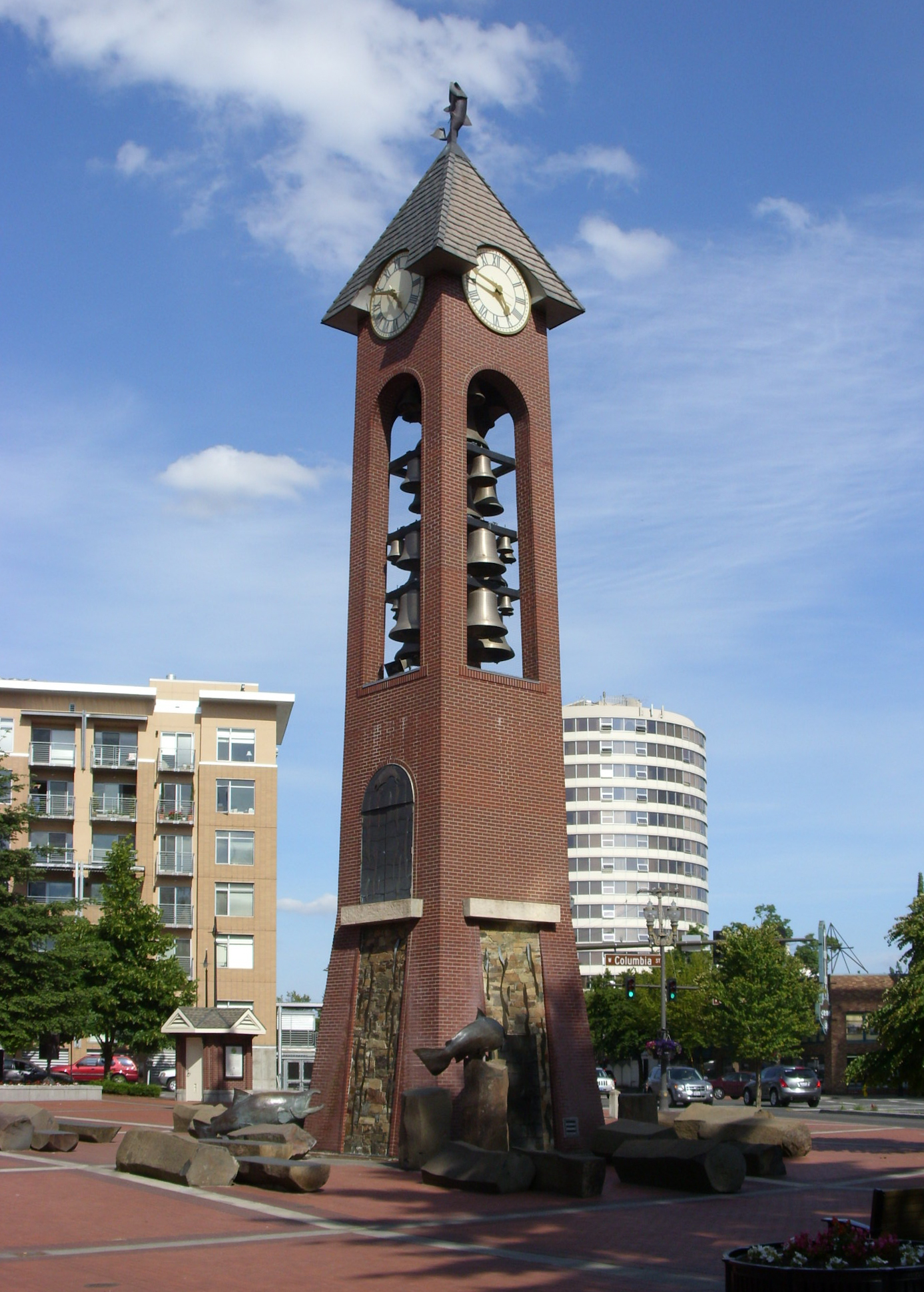
- The bell tower in 2008
- Interactive map of the Salmon Run Bell Tower area

General information
- Location: Vancouver, Washington, United States
- Coordinates: 45.625888°N 122.674386°W

Height
- Height: 69 feet (21 meters)

Design and construction
- Architect: Cindy Sterry

The Salmon Run Bell Tower is a bell tower and glockenspiel in Vancouver, Washington's Esther Short Park, in the United States.

== Description ==
The tower is in Propstra Square, the southeast corner of Esther Short Park, near the intersection of 6th and Columbia Street. The 69-foot (21 m) tower was designed by architect Cindy Sterry, and features a clock by the Verdin Bells & Clock Company and glockenspiel diorama which tells a story about the Chinookan peoples. The tower also features the art installation Spiraling Salmon by Jim Demetro, who also designed the nearby statue of George Vancouver (2000). The installation features bronze sculptures of salmon.

== History ==
Funded by philanthropist George Propstra and donations by other local businessmen, the tower was dedicated in 2002. Propstra contributed $3 million.

== See also ==
- The Pioneer Mother Memorial, also installed in Esther Short Park
