= Slocum House (Vancouver, Washington) =

Historic house in Washington, United States

- U.S. National Register of Historic Places
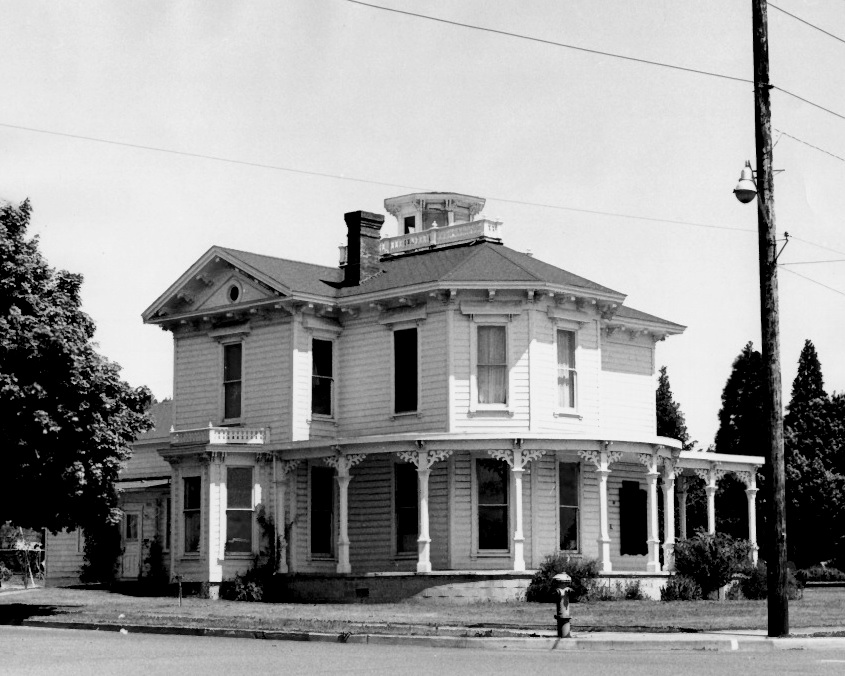

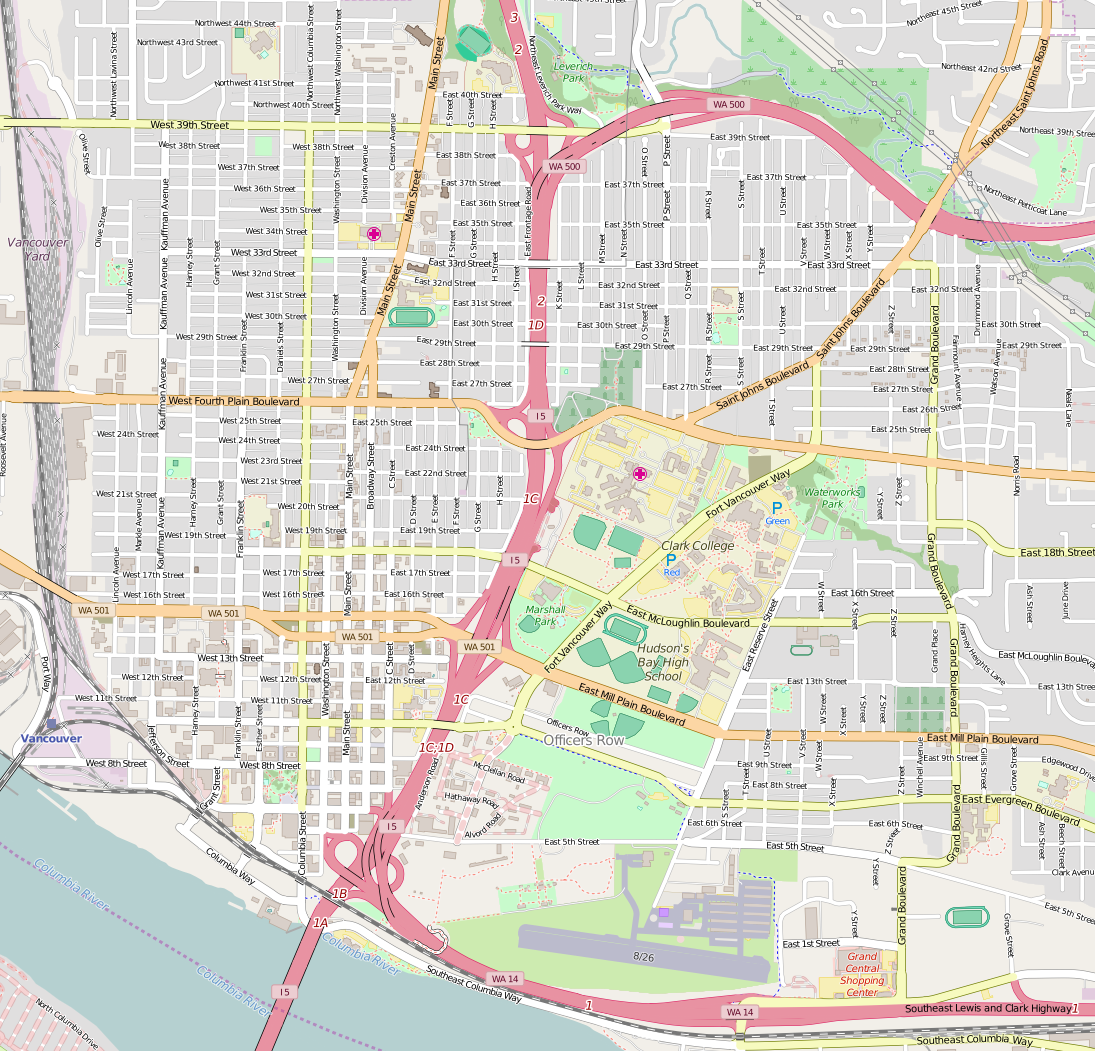
- Location within Vancouver Washington
- Location: 605 Esther Street; Vancouver, Washington
- Coordinates: 45°38′7″N 122°40′27″W
- Area: less than one acre
- Built: 1867
- Architectural style: Carpenter Victorian
- NRHP reference No.: 73001867
- Added to NRHP: January 18, 1973

The Slocum House is a Victorian style house located in Vancouver, Washington, in the United States, which today stands at the southwest corner of Esther Short Park. It is the only surviving structure in its former residential neighborhood of the Vancouver historic core.

== Architecture and construction ==
The style also has been called Carpenter Victorian to emphasize both the vertical, Italianate features and the skill of craftsmanship, believed to be the work of Edward Slocum, brother of the owner. Ornamental medallions inside the house were signed and included patent dates from 1842 and 1846, although the house is believed by some to have been constructed in 1867. The 1867 date is not supported by local newspaper reports as there was no dwelling on the land at this time, and Charles W. Slocum was still busy in other areas of the Pacific Northwest. However many websites and reference books do mention the 1867 date, perhaps using a common source.

After returning to Washington Territory in 1869, Slocum became interested in building a mansion in the vicinity of downtown Vancouver. The foundation was laid in May 1877, further progress despite "its large dimensions, and the substantial character of the materials and work" was reported in late June 1877, and work was completed by the beginning of 1878. When completed and unveiled to society on New Year's Day in 1878, the Vancouver Independent reported:

Mr. and Mrs. Charles Slocum received their friends at their elegant new home on New Year's day. They have now finished and nearly furnished one of the handsomest residences in Washington Territory. For completeness, neatness, convenience, and architectural beauty, it discounts any house we know of in the country. Their friends are glad to see them so agreeably situated.

Charles W. Slocum had been trained as a carpenter in Rhode Island, and in 1857 he arrived in Vancouver and worked as a carpenter at the Vancouver Barracks. Later, he became superintendent of the barracks. In 1860, Slocum opened several general stores in the Pacific Northwest. He is credited with platting the town of Boise, Idaho, in 1863.

== History and ownership ==
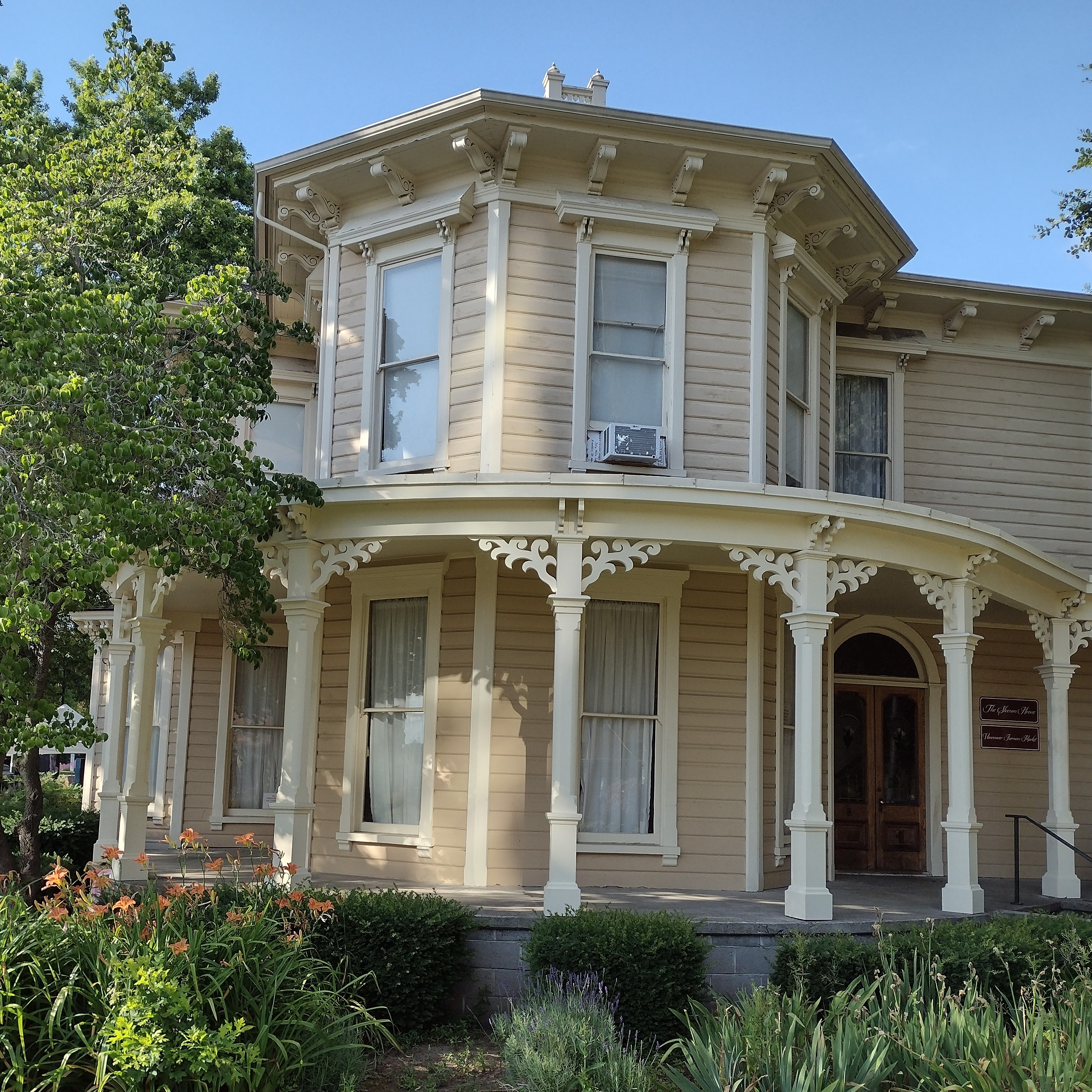
The Slocum House in July 2022

The land for the original site was sold by Esther Short in 1849 to W. L. Stabler for $225, and the Slocums later purchased it for $700 for their family home in what was the "premier residential area" of old Vancouver.

In 1929, the house was sold to the family of Frederick Leadbetter, and it was used as an office for the Columbia River Paper Company until the 1960s.

== Restoration ==
The house had been abandoned in 1965, and had been scheduled to be demolished, with one city councilman calling it "the worst eyesore I've even seen". Robert Hidden of the Fort Vancouver Historical Society and Hermine Decker of the Old Slocum House Theatre Company spearheaded the drive to restore the historic structure as a community theatre. It was moved one block from its original location in 1966, and listed on the National Register of Historic Places in 1973. The Slocum House is the only surviving structure in its former residential neighborhood of the Vancouver historic core.

After seven years and an estimated 500,000 hours of volunteer work, the house finally satisfied city fire and safety codes in August 1974, and had already hosted 11 plays in the 60-seat theatre. Modern plays, however, were not among the offerings; as Decker told The Columbian in 1983, "We feel all our plays should be 19th century, to complement the historic house." Community theatre productions were ongoing as of 2011.

In August 2019, the website for the Slocum House, which had previously advertised the site's availability for weddings, parties, and other gatherings, announced that it was "not accepting new events".
