= Vancouver Farmers Market =

- Location: Esther Short Park, Vancouver, Washington, U.S.
- Opening date: 1990
- Environment: Outdoor
- Goods sold: Crafts; drinks; food; locally grown vegetables; artisan goods
- Days normally open: Weekends (historically between April and October; now year-round)
- Number of tenants: approximately 200 vendors

The Vancouver Farmers Market is held at Esther Short Park in Vancouver, Washington, United States. There are approximately 200 vendors selling crafts, drinks, and food. Historically, the market takes place on weekends between April and October. It is now accessible year-round.

The market has been held at the park since 1990. It claims to be the second largest farmers' market in Washington.

Rachel Pinsky included the market in Eater Portland's 2025 overview of the best restaurants and bars in Vancouver. She wrote, "This popular downtown farmers market ... [offers] the perfect place to pick up locally grown vegetables, artisan goods, and some of the best food in Vancouver. Standouts include dan bing and fan tuan from Taiwanese food stall Small Eats, spicy ahi poke from Husubis’ Poke Shop, and Detroit pizza from Pi Square. Pi Square’s owner Sally Huynh hails from Houston and occasionally collaborates with barbecue purveyors for interesting Houston meets Detroit mash-ups like smoked barbecue chicken, peach bacon jam, and Alabama white sauce arranged on top of the classic Motown spongy crust with crispy edges."
