= Officers Row, Fort Vancouver Barracks =

- U.S. National Register of Historic Places
- U.S. Historic district
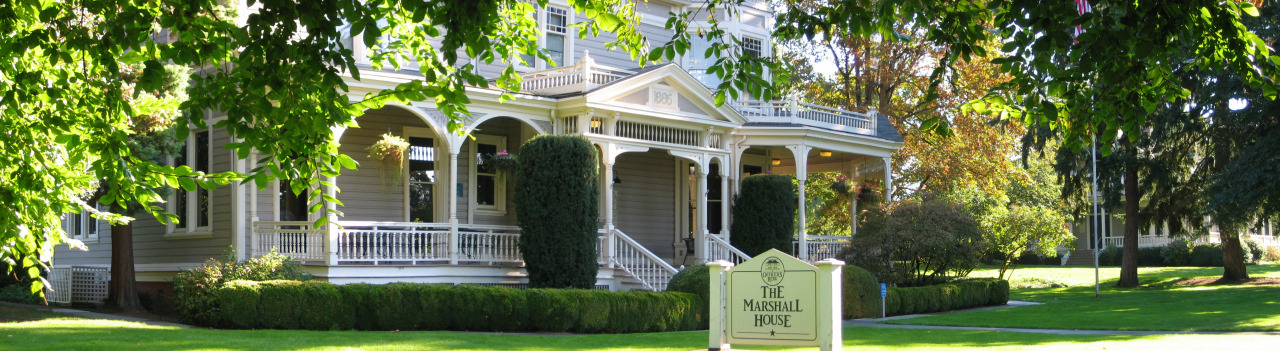
- The Marshall House, built in 1886

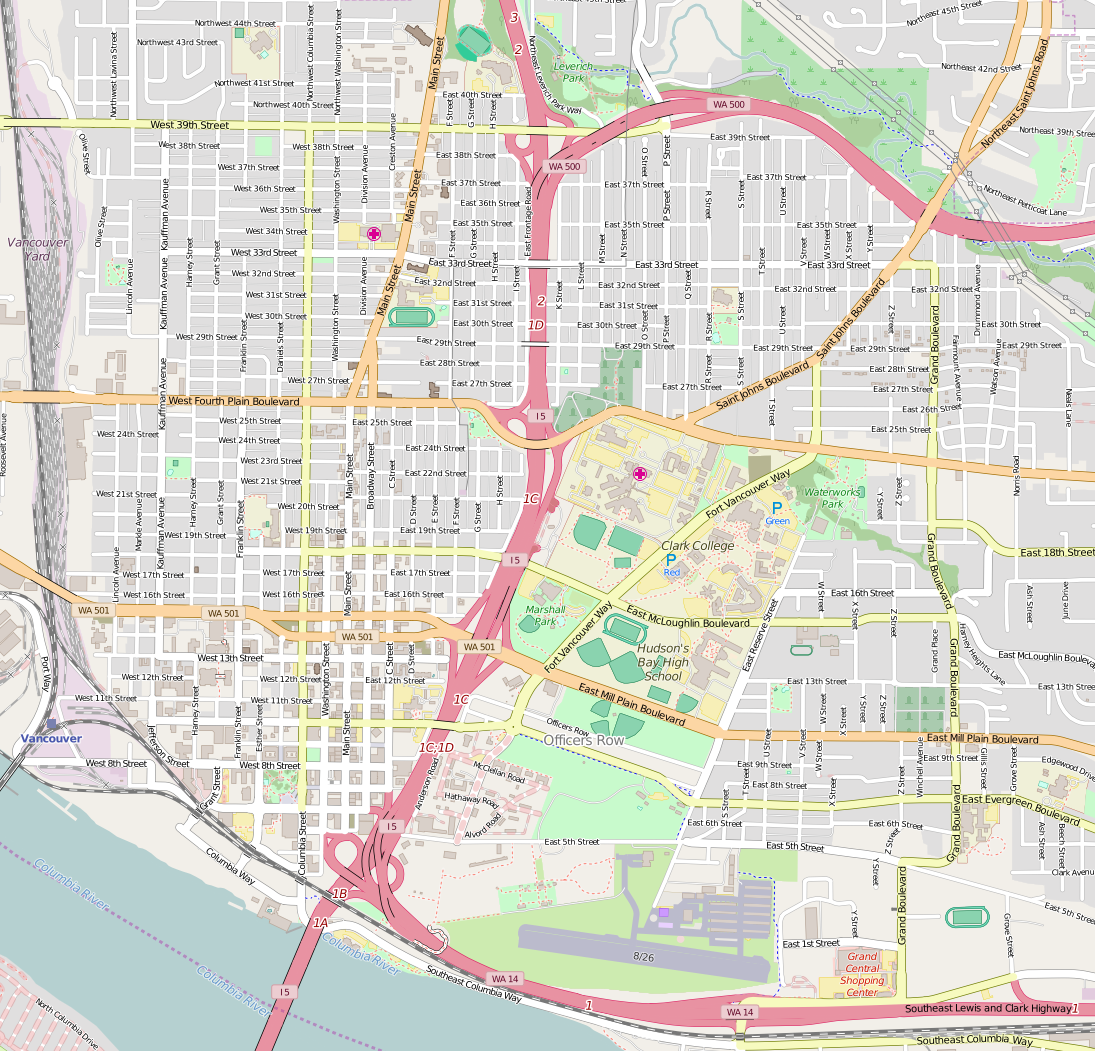
- Location within Washington (state) Location within Vancouver Washington
- Location: 611 - 1616 E. Evergreen Blvd. Vancouver, Washington
- Coordinates: 45.6277°N 122.6593°W
- Area: 20.5 acres (8.3 ha)
- NRHP reference No.: 74001948
- Added to NRHP: November 11, 1974

Officers Row, a part of the Vancouver National Historic Reserve Historic District, is a congregation of 21 of the former homes of U.S. military officers stationed at the Vancouver Barracks in Vancouver, Washington. The oldest of the homes, named the Grant House (after Ulysses S. Grant, who was stationed at the barracks as a Captain at that time but never lived in the house), dates from 1846, and the last edifice was constructed in 1906. In the 1970s a grassroots campaign to refurbish the dilapidated properties began to appear, and the site was added to the National Register of Historic Places in 1974. In 1980, the U.S. Army declared it a surplus, and it was henceforth deeded to the city for one dollar. A $10.9 million rehabilitation effort proceeded in 1987. Today these homes have been fully restored, and now house several commercial and 34 residential rental spaces.

== See also ==
- Firsts Monument
