= Morrison Bridge =

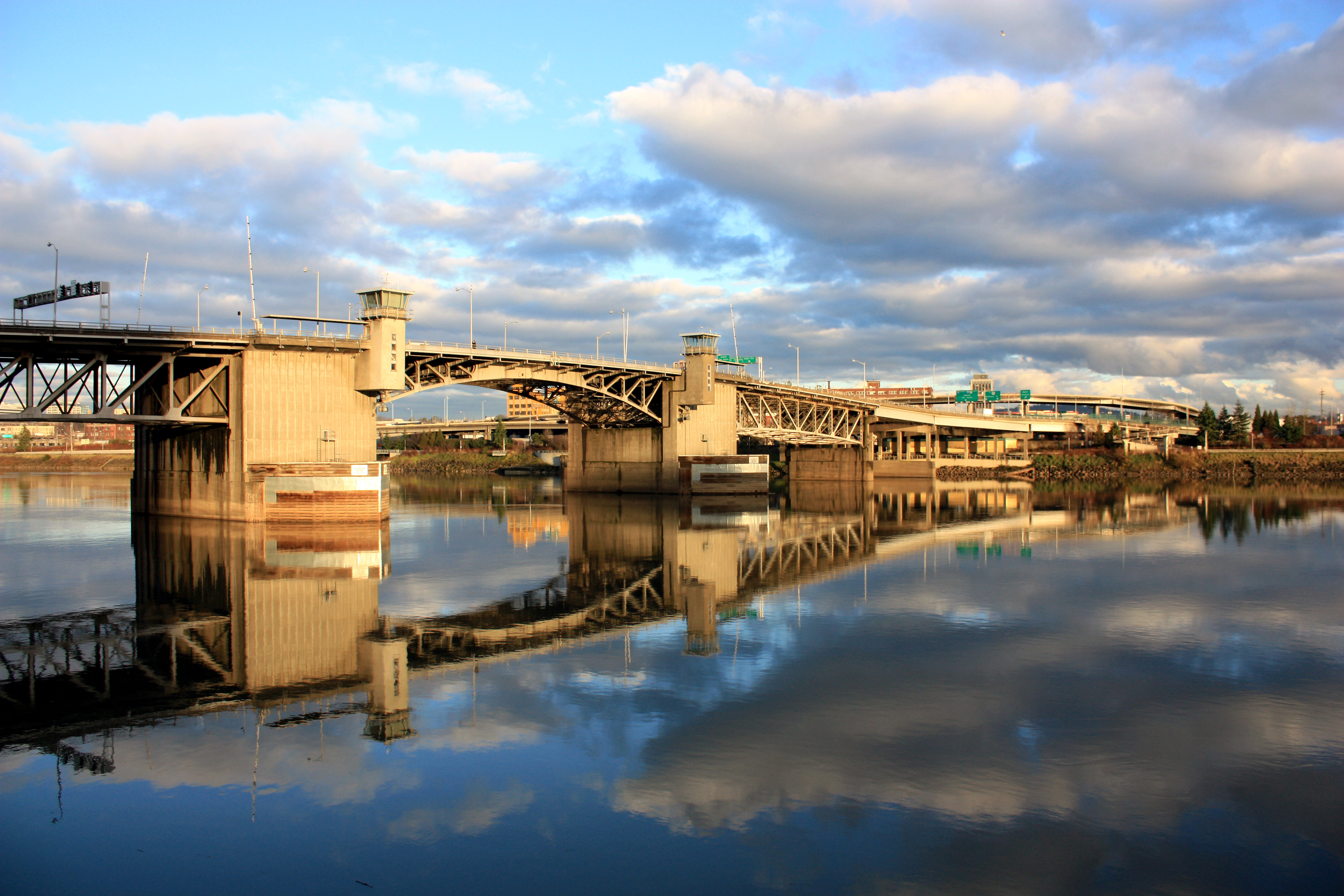
- Coordinates: 45°31′04″N 122°40′12″W
- Carries: motor vehicles, pedestrians, cyclists
- Crosses: Willamette River
- Locale: Portland, Oregon, U.S.
- Maintained by: Multnomah County
- ID number: 02758

Characteristics
- Design: double-leaf "Chicago style" bascule
- Total length: 760 feet (230 m)
- Width: 90 feet (27 m)
- Longest span: 284 feet (87 m)
- Clearance below: 69 feet (21 m)

History
- Opened: May 24, 1958 (replaced 1887 and 1905 bridges)
- Morrison Bridge
- U.S. National Register of Historic Places
- Location: Portland, Oregon; Willamette River at river mile 12.8
- Coordinates: 45°31′04″N 122°40′11″W
- MPS: Willamette River Highway Bridges of Portland, Oregon
- NRHP reference No.: 12000933
- Added to NRHP: November 14, 2012

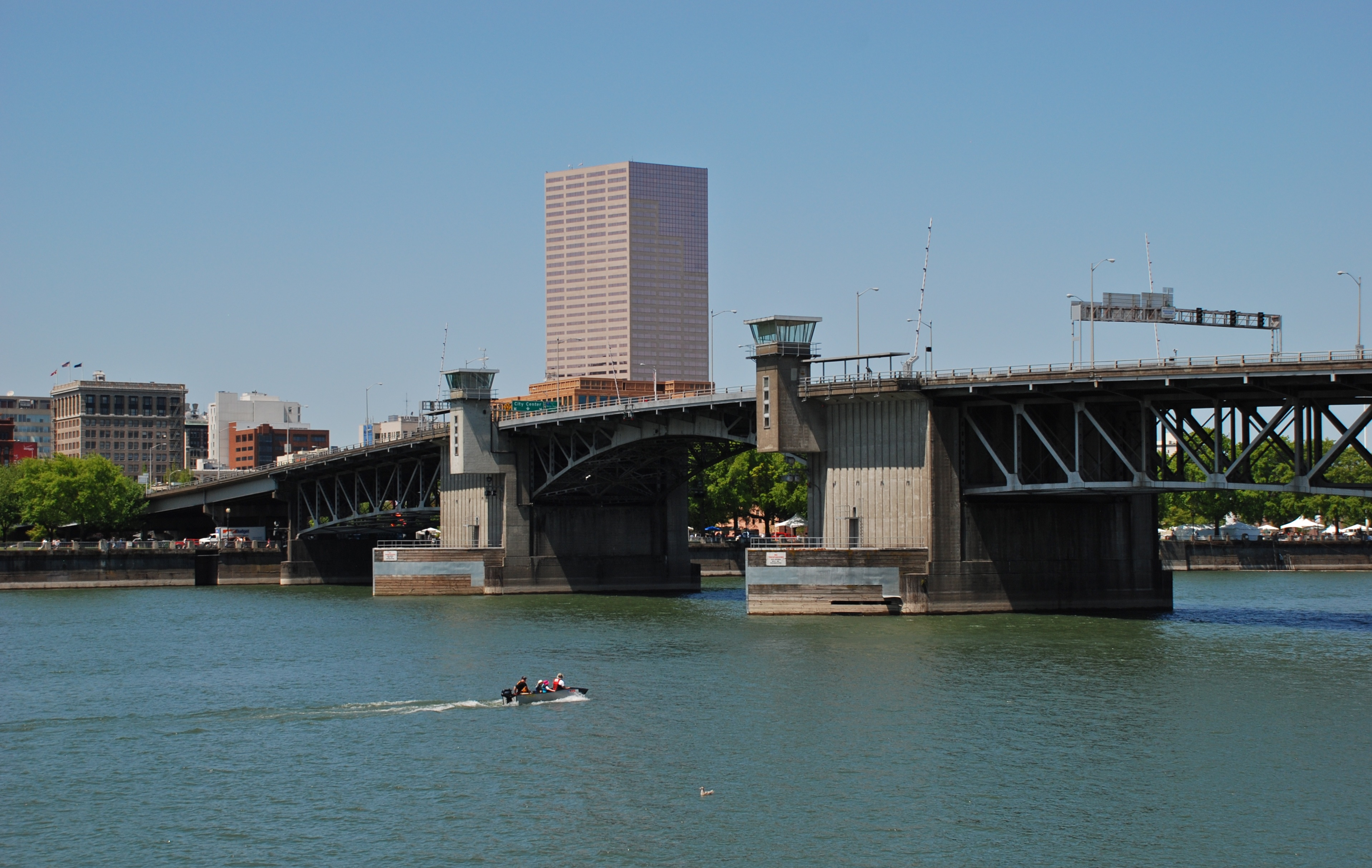
Viewed from the Eastbank Esplanade

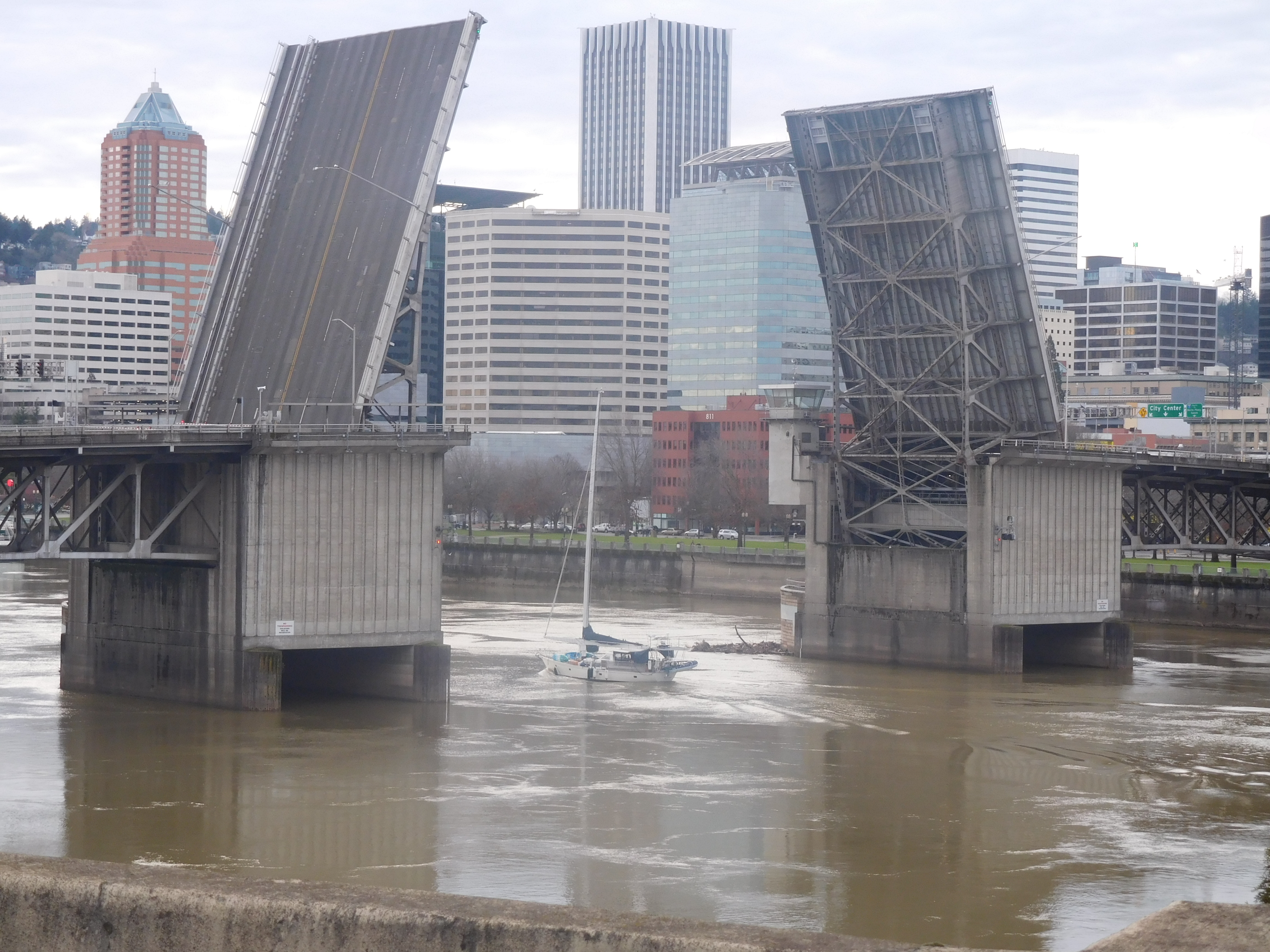
The opened Morrison Bridge, photographed from East Portland

The Morrison Bridge is a bascule bridge that spans the Willamette River in Portland, Oregon. Completed in 1958, it is the third bridge at approximately the same site to carry that name. It is one of the most heavily used bridges in Portland. It was added to the National Register of Historic Places in November 2012.

== Predecessors ==
The original Morrison Bridge (or Morrison Street Bridge) was a wooden truss swing-span bridge that opened to the public on April 9, 1887 (with a formal opening three days later), as the first Willamette River bridge in Portland and the longest bridge west of the Mississippi River. It was named for the street it carried, which had been named for John L. Morrison, a Scottish immigrant who built the first home on Morrison Street. It was first a toll bridge (rates: horse-drawn rig - US$0.15, team of horses - $0.20, pedestrian - $0.05) but went toll-free in 1895. The second Morrison was another swing bridge that was built in 1905. It was not designed for automobiles and the 1958 replacement was long overdue.

The first Morrison Bridge carried horsecars starting in March 1888, about a year after the bridge opened. Electric streetcars, introduced in Portland in November 1889, replaced horsecar service on the bridge in stages starting in 1890. Streetcars also crossed the second (1905) Morrison bridge, but not the third (1958), as the last lines of Portland's past streetcar system had been abandoned by the time it opened.

== History of present bridge ==
The present bridge was built by Multnomah County. It was completed on May 24, 1958, at a cost of $12.9 million. In 1961, Interstate 5 and Interstate 84 ramps were added.

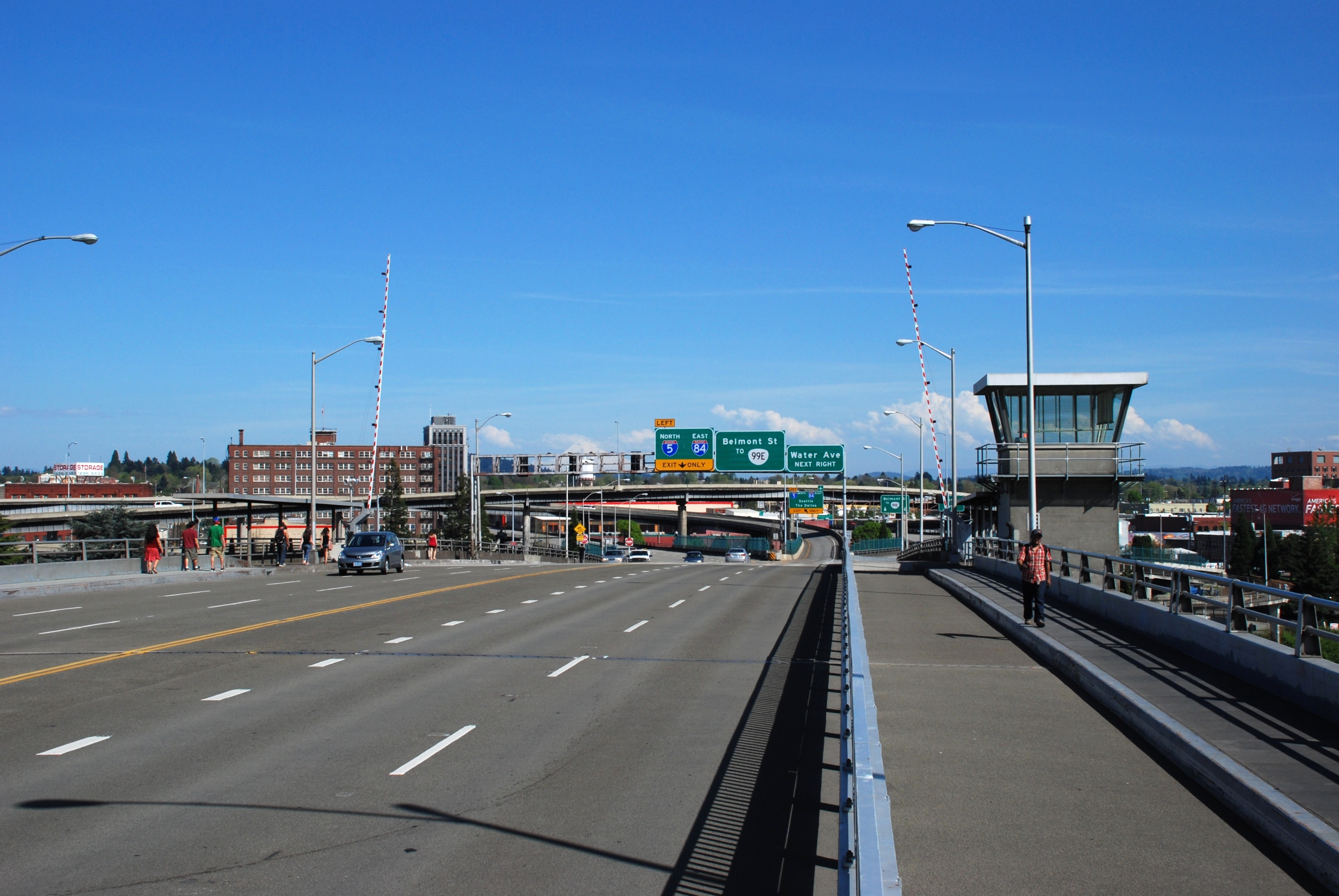
The bridge's deck after the 2011–12 renovations that removed the steel grating. Also visible are signs indicating the freeway connections.

In 1987, the Morrison Bridge became the first bridge illuminated by the Willamette Light Brigade. In 2007, the original 16 colored floodlamps illuminating the concrete piers were replaced by energy-efficient and computer-controlled LEDs. Different colors may be selected for each of eight zones of the piers. Static and animated patterns may be requested for a fee which ranges from $100 per night to $1200 per month (as of 2009).

Access for bicycles and pedestrians was improved in a $1.9 million project which began construction in March 2009 and added a barrier-separated path on the south side. Previously, there were only narrow sidewalks. In 2011–12, the steel grating on the bascule deck was replaced with fiber-reinforced polymer panels to provide better traction for vehicles. The work was completed in March 2012, but problems with the new deck panels began to be reported in fall 2013. Multnomah County anticipates a major seismic upgrade around 2020. The bridge was added to the National Register of Historic Places in November 2012.

== Description and statistics ==
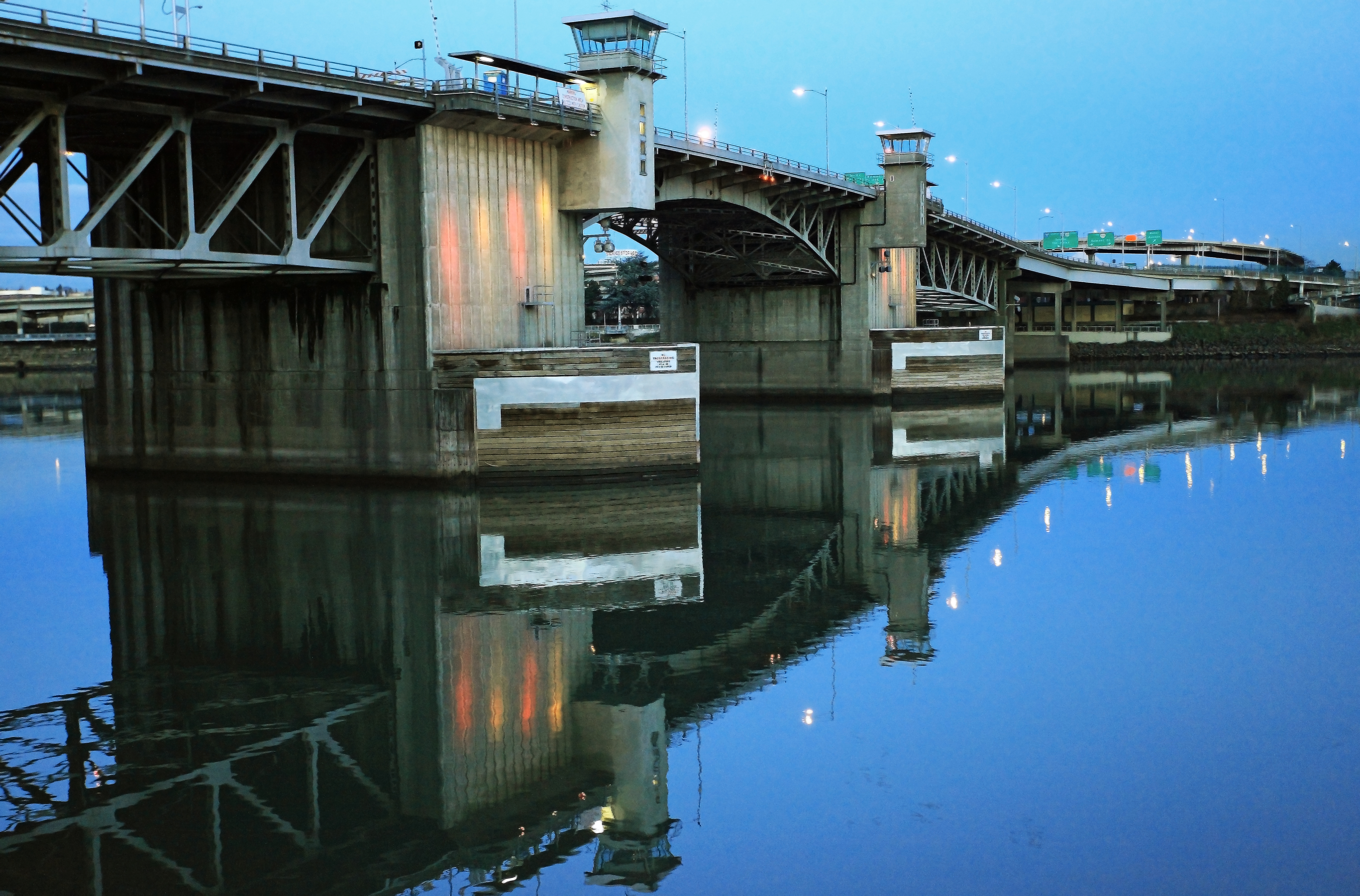
Colored LEDs highlighting the bridge piers at dusk

The bridge is the largest mechanical device in Oregon. 36-foot-tall (11 m) gears drive 940-ton counterweights located inside each of the piers. The 69-foot (21 m) clearance is sufficient for most river traffic, requiring bridge openings only about 30 times a month. The bridge currently carries 50,000 vehicles daily in six lanes. The canted windows of the control tower give the distinctive look of air traffic control towers. The current bridge does not connect to Morrison Street at its west end because the second bridge was left in operation while the latest version was built, necessitating that the replacement bridge be on a different alignment.

In 2005, the bridge opened for river traffic an average of 33 times a month.

== See also ==
- List of bridges documented by the Historic American Engineering Record in Oregon
- List of bridges on the National Register of Historic Places in Oregon
- List of crossings of the Willamette River
