= Firsts Monument =

Monument in Vancouver, Washington, U.S.

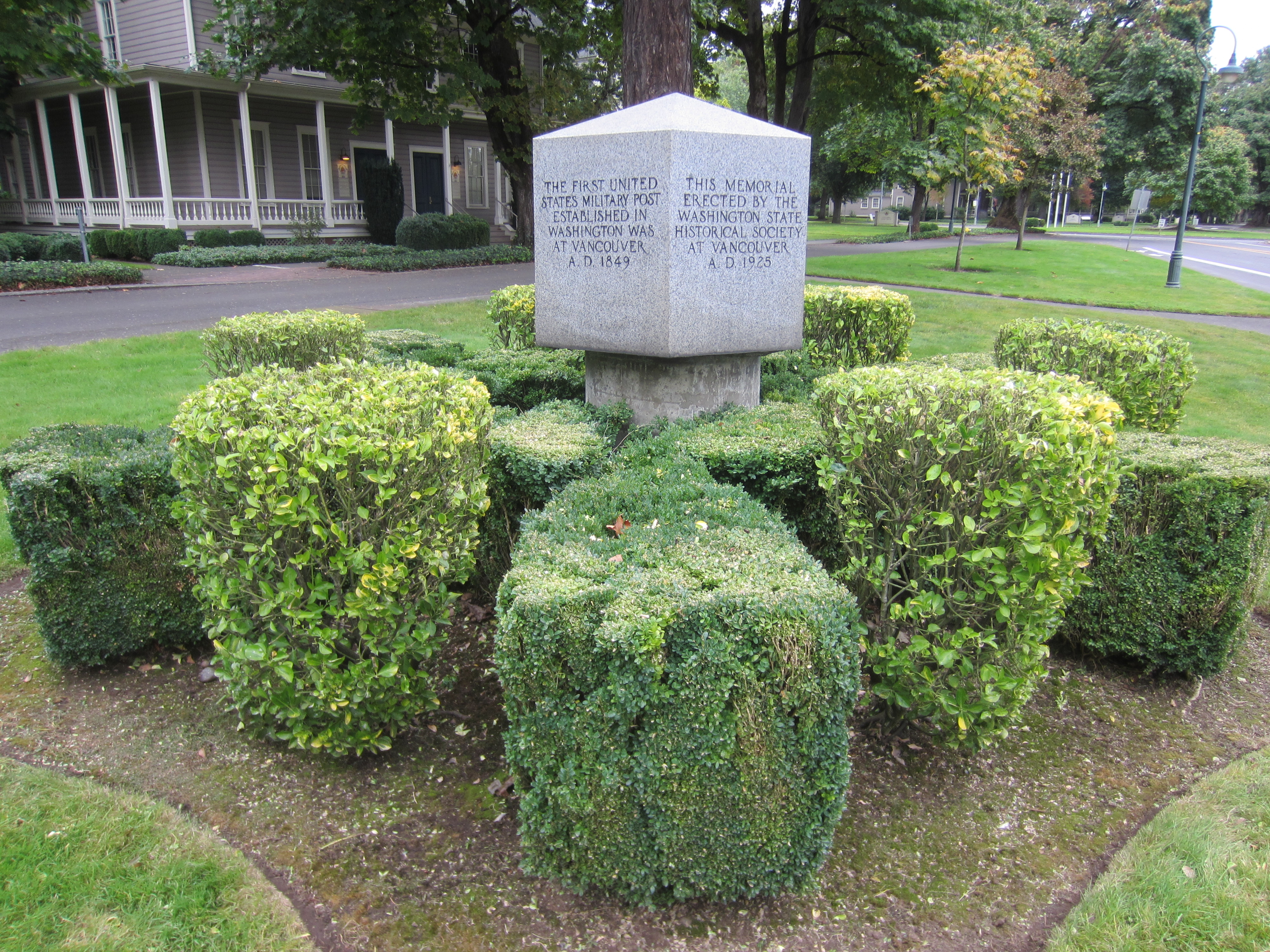
- The monument in 2020
- Location: Fort Vancouver National Historic Site, Vancouver, Washington, U.S.
- Coordinates: 45°37′44″N 122°39′52″W
- Dedicated date: 1925

The Firsts Monument is installed along Officers Row in the Vancouver, Washington portion of the Fort Vancouver National Historic Site. The monument, erected by the Washington State Historical Society in 1925, commemorates several "firsts" to occur at Fort Vancouver, within the Washington Territory, including the first military post, school, and sermon delivery.

== See also ==
- 1925 in art
