= Esther Short Park =

Park in Clark County, Washington, United States

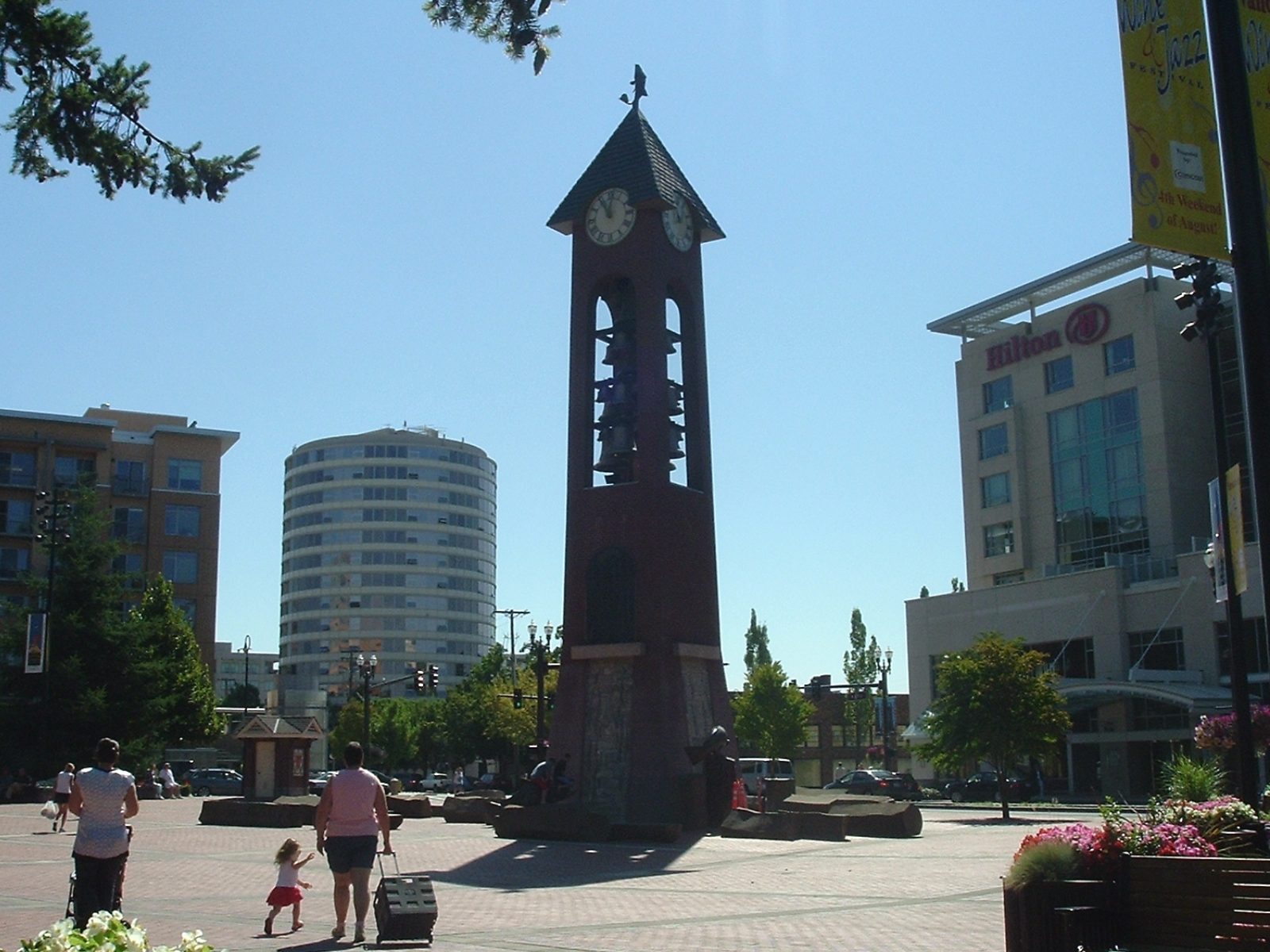
- The Salmon Run Bell Tower, in the park's Propstra Square

- Location within Washington (state) Location within the United States
- Type: Public park
- Location: downtown Vancouver, Washington
- Coordinates: 45°37′35″N 122°40′30″W
- Created: 1853

Esther Short Park is a public park and town square located in downtown Vancouver, Washington. Established in 1853, it is the oldest public park in the state of Washington, and one of the oldest public parks in the West.

It is located in the city's downtown between West Columbia and 8th Street. It was bequeathed to the city in 1862, and includes a children's playground, a rose garden, a large fountain system made of columnar basalt, the Salmon Run Bell Tower, and the historic Slocum House. The park also houses Vancouver Farmers Market, a weekend farmer's market. In the summer of 2007, the park hosted over 30 outdoor summer concerts, many free.

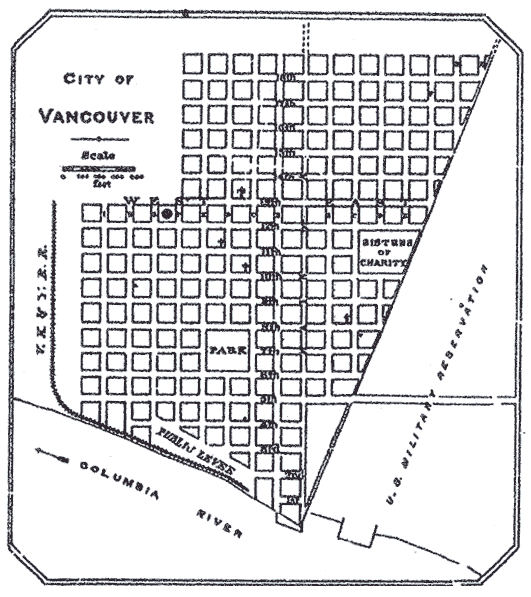
1888 map of Vancouver, showing the park occupying four city blocks between 6th and 8th.

== Esther Short ==
Esther Short was an early Vancouver resident. She and her husband Amos, and ten children, "jumped a claim" near present-day downtown Vancouver. This land was originally part of a larger land plot by American Henry Williamson, who mapped out a little town called Vancouver City and registered the claim in the US courthouse in Oregon City. He left his caretaker, David Gardner, in charge of the land before leaving for California. During a dispute, Amos Short killed Gardner, though he was acquitted of any crime. Short used his courtroom experience to become a judge and claim the disputed land for himself. He died during a return voyage from selling local produce in San Francisco. With Williamson's registered claim intact, Esther Short filed papers to claim the land. Ultimately, she obtained part of the land (including the parcel which includes present-day Esther Short Park), along with the Catholic Church and Vancouver City. She also gave permission to use house ferry boats to land on her property, at the foot of present-day Washington Street, where she operated a restaurant and hotel called The Alta House.

The park was part of this land, bequeathed as a public plaza by Esther after Amos died in a shipwreck at the mouth of the Columbia. Some of her other land is now the Port of Vancouver. Esther Short Park's The Pioneer Mother Memorial (1928) was sculpted by Avard Fairbanks.

== Contemporary development ==
Before the last decade or so, downtown Vancouver was in serious economic decline, and the park was mainly home to transients. A 1996 Columbian article named the park as the nucleus of the majority of emergency 911 calls in the city. As part of the push for revitalization by mayor Royce Pollard and others, the park received $5.67 million in direct aid, and investment of $220 million of capital funded a slew of development in and surrounding the park. This movement to revamp the park is widely believed to have been jump started by a 1997 incident involving Pollard at a series of social events he designed to make the park a family-friendly gathering place. According to reports, a transient individual pushed Pollard in the back with a shopping cart, and made threatening comments warning him to leave. The man was arrested, and henceforth public interest and support in reclaiming the park surged. In the summer of 2007, the property received the "Development of Excellence" award from the Urban Land Institute of Oregon and Southwest Washington. It was also honored as one of the nation's "ten great public spaces" by the American Planning Association for 2013.
