= Wendy Rose (sculpture) =

Statue in Vancouver, Washington, U.S.

- Artist: Women Who Weld
- Medium: Stainless steel; glass
- Dimensions: 3.0 m (10 ft)
- Location: Vancouver, Washington, U.S.
- 45°36′52″N 122°39′04″W

Wendy Rose is a 10-foot (3.0 m) sculpture installed in Vancouver, Washington, United States. According to The Columbian, the statue represents Wendy the Welder, a sister of Rosie the Riveter who worked at the Kaiser Shipyards during World War II. The 1,000-pound stainless steel and glass statue was created by six artists and Clark College students collectively known as Women Who Weld in 2005, and unveiled to residents in 2007.

The statue was installed on the Columbia River waterfront trail east of Interstate 5 in 2008. The artwork commemorates those who worked at the Kaiser Shipyards during World War II. In 2013, the head piece in the form of a red bandana was stolen. A reward was offered for the head's return. Students in a Fort Vancouver High School welding class made a metal head resembling the fictional robot Bender from Futurama as a temporary replacement.
