= Clark County Veterans War Memorial =

War memorial in Vancouver, Washington, U.S.

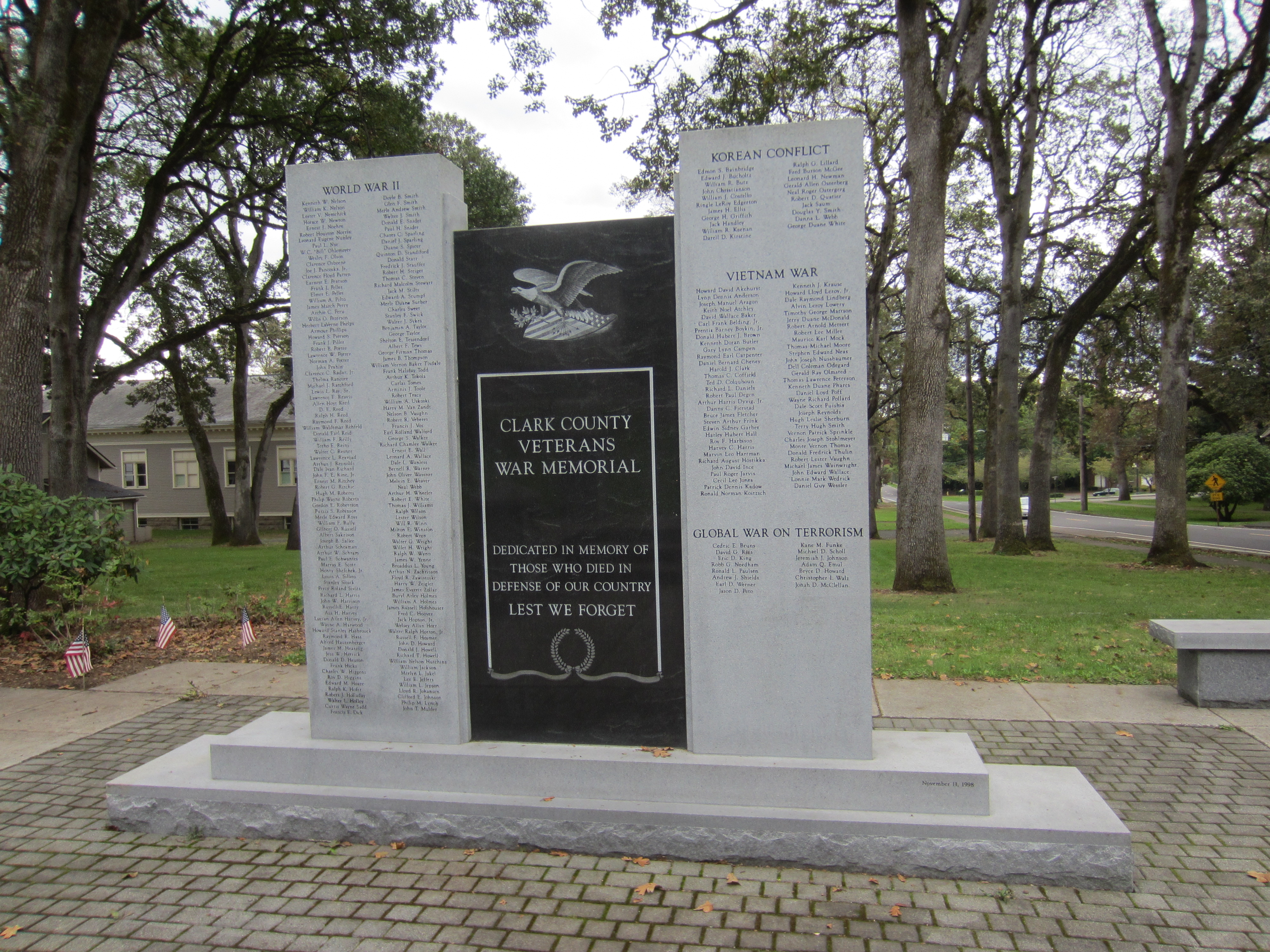
- The monument in 2020
- Interactive map of Clark County Veterans War Memorial
- Location: Fort Vancouver National Historic Site, Vancouver, Washington, U.S.
- Coordinates: 45°37′36.72″N 122°39′52.38″W

The Clark County Veterans War Memorial is installed in the Vancouver, Washington portion of the Fort Vancouver National Historic Site, in the United States.
