= Statue of George Vancouver (Vancouver, Washington) =

Statue in Vancouver, Washington, U.S.

Captain George Vancouver
- The statue in 2019
- Year: 2000
- Medium: Bronze sculpture
- Subject: George Vancouver
- Location: Vancouver, Washington, U.S.; 45.625860°N 122.676246°W

Captain George Vancouver is a 2000 bronze sculpture of George Vancouver by Jim Demetro, installed in Vancouver, Washington, United States. The statue is located at the corner of Sixth and Esther streets near Esther Short Park. It is 9 feet (2.7 m) tall and weighs approximately 1,500 lbs. The cost of approximately $70,000 was funded by private donors.

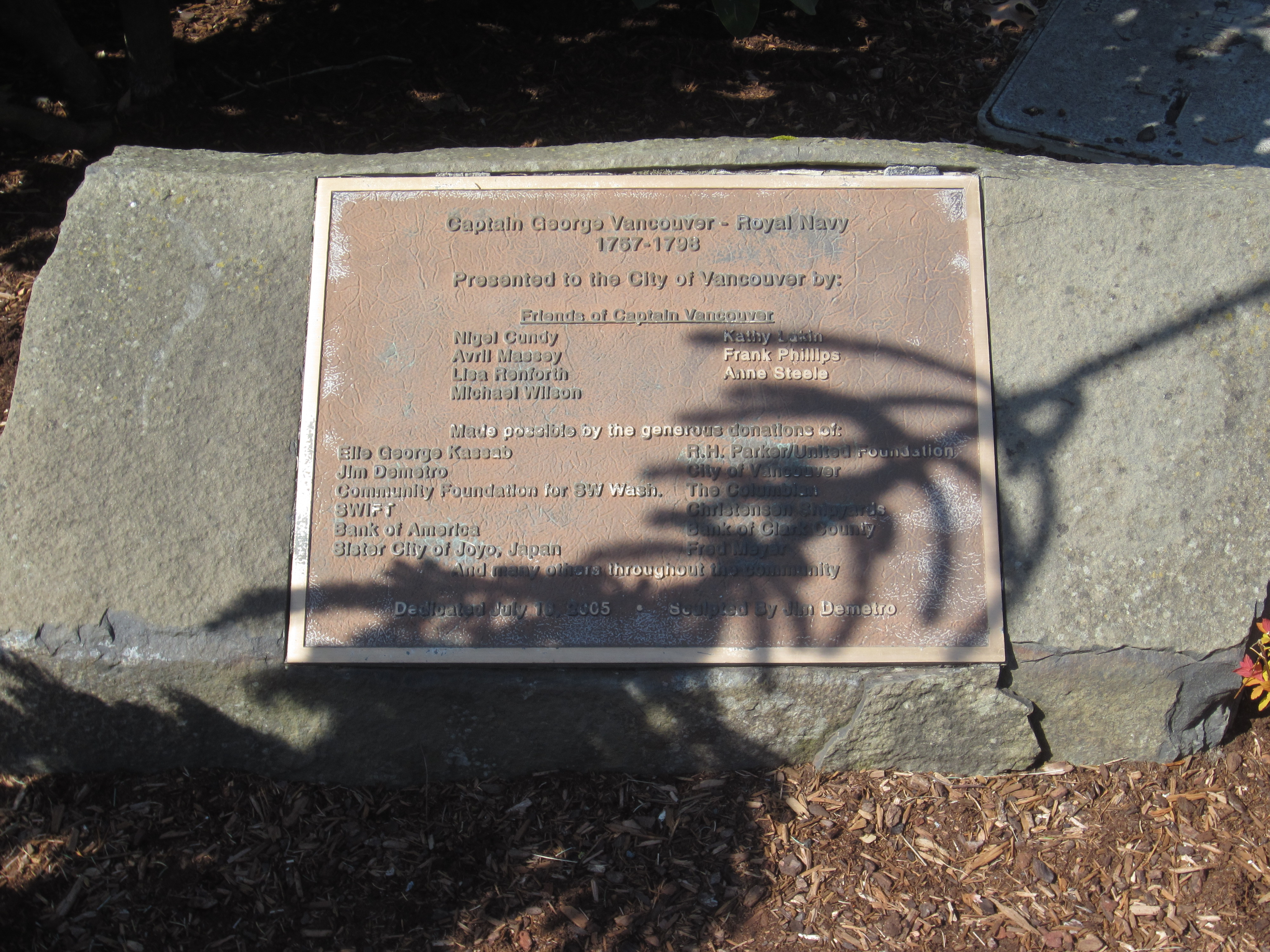
Plaque for the sculpture, 2019

== See also ==
- 2000 in art
