= Esther Short =

American settler, founder of Vancouver (1806–1862)

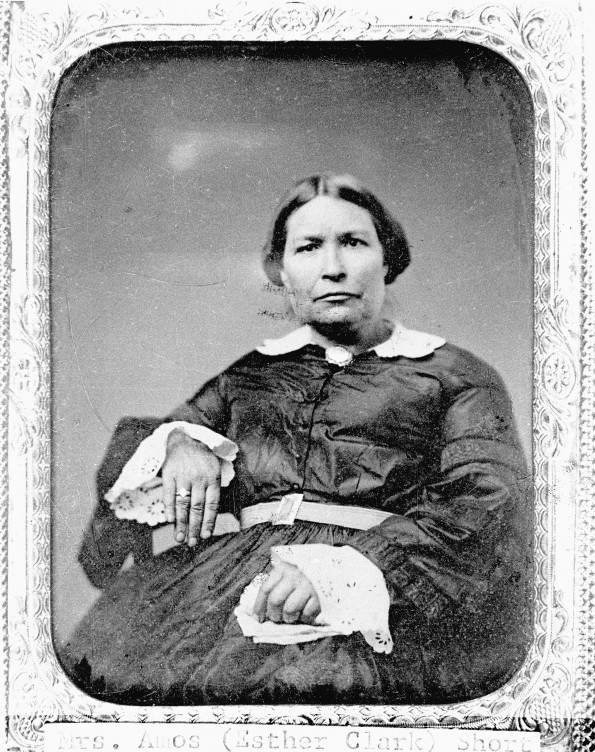
- Born: Esther Clark; December 24, 1806; Tioga County, Pennsylvania, U.S.
- Died: June 28, 1862 (aged 55); Vancouver, Washington, U.S.
- Known for: Founder of Vancouver, Washington
- Spouse: Amos Short (m. 1829; died 1853)

Esther Clark Short (December 24, 1806 – June 28, 1862) was an early American settler of what would become the State of Washington. She was a founder of the City of Vancouver, Washington. Part of her land bequeath became Esther Short Park, which is the oldest public square in the state of Washington. She was able to achieve this though it was not legal for women in the territory of Washington to own property prior to 1881.

== History ==
=== Early life and settlement ===
Esther Clark was born on December 24, 1806, in Tioga County, Pennsylvania. Accounts of her heritage vary: Sources state she was either half-Algonquin, half-German, or entirely Native American (one-fourth Cherokee, one-fourth Algonquin, and one-half Six Nations). She and her sister, Jane, were raised Roman Catholic and survived the War of 1812 and the Black Hawk War of 1832. While attending school, she became educated in shooting, food preservation, and herbal medicine. After marrying husband Amos Short in November 1829, the family moved West to Illinois in 1837. A few years later, the family moved further West to the Oregon territory in 1845. They settled near Fort Vancouver in 1847 on a plot of land originally claimed by Henry Williamson, who had left the land in the care of the Hudson's Bay Company. This led to a conflict between the Shorts and the Hudson's Bay Company officials, as tensions remained high between British fur traders and American settlers in the area. The Treaty of Oregon specifically stipulated that Hudson's Bay's property rights were to be respected, and the British officers repeatedly tried to drive the Shorts back to the American territory South of the Columbia River. Over the course of her life, Esther raised a total of ten children and gave birth to twelve, with two dying in early childhood.

=== Family controversy ===
Soon after Amos and Esther Short and their eight children landed in Fort Vancouver, the established Hudson's Bay Company within the vicinity did not welcome them and made every effort to evict the Short family from their newly settled home, including attempting to destroy their fences. Once, while Amos was away, the British forced Esther and her children into a boat and set them adrift onto the Columbia river. While she and her children succeeded in safely making it back home, afterwards, her husband Amos kept a firearm ready to defend his family along with a strict warning to the British to stay off their land. The British ignored Amos' warning by sending men to their home, resulting in an altercation and shooting that ended in the deaths of two men. Amos was charged with murder and brought to court, but was later acquitted of the charges. During Amos' time in court, Hudson's Bay Company sent more men under the leadership of French-Canadian Lieutenant Francis Facette to the Short home to, once again, destroy their fences. Esther, disgusted with the persistence of the British, slapped Facette across the face, toppling him to the ground. In light of her courage and fortitude, the Hudson's Bay Company finally abandoned their efforts, and Esther Short and her family remained, with Esther becoming a pioneering developer of the city of Vancouver and a notable part of its history.

=== Founding of Vancouver ===
Shortly after his acquittal, Amos Short drowned while returning on a trip from California aboard the ship the Vandalia, which sank in the Columbia Bar. Following his death in 1853, Esther filed papers to claim 640 acres of her husband's land pursuant to the Donation Land Claims Act. She opened a restaurant on the land that same year, and opened a hotel the year following. In 1855, she donated a parcel of land for use of the city. Included in this parcel was land bequeathed as a public plaza which later became Esther Short Park, as well as a strip of waterfront to be a public wharf, on which Berth One of the Port of Vancouver now stands. The City of Vancouver was incorporated two years later in 1857.

== Death ==
Short died on June 28, 1862, and was interred at the old Vancouver city cemetery.
