= Monument to the Three Kichis =

Monument in Vancouver, Washington, U.S.

- The monument in 2020
- Location: Fort Vancouver National Historic Site, Vancouver, Washington, U.S.
- Coordinates: 45°37′35.1″N 122°39′25.5″W

The Monument to the Three Kichis is a memorial installed in the Vancouver, Washington portion of the Fort Vancouver National Historic Site, in the United States. The monument was dedicated on August 1, 1989.

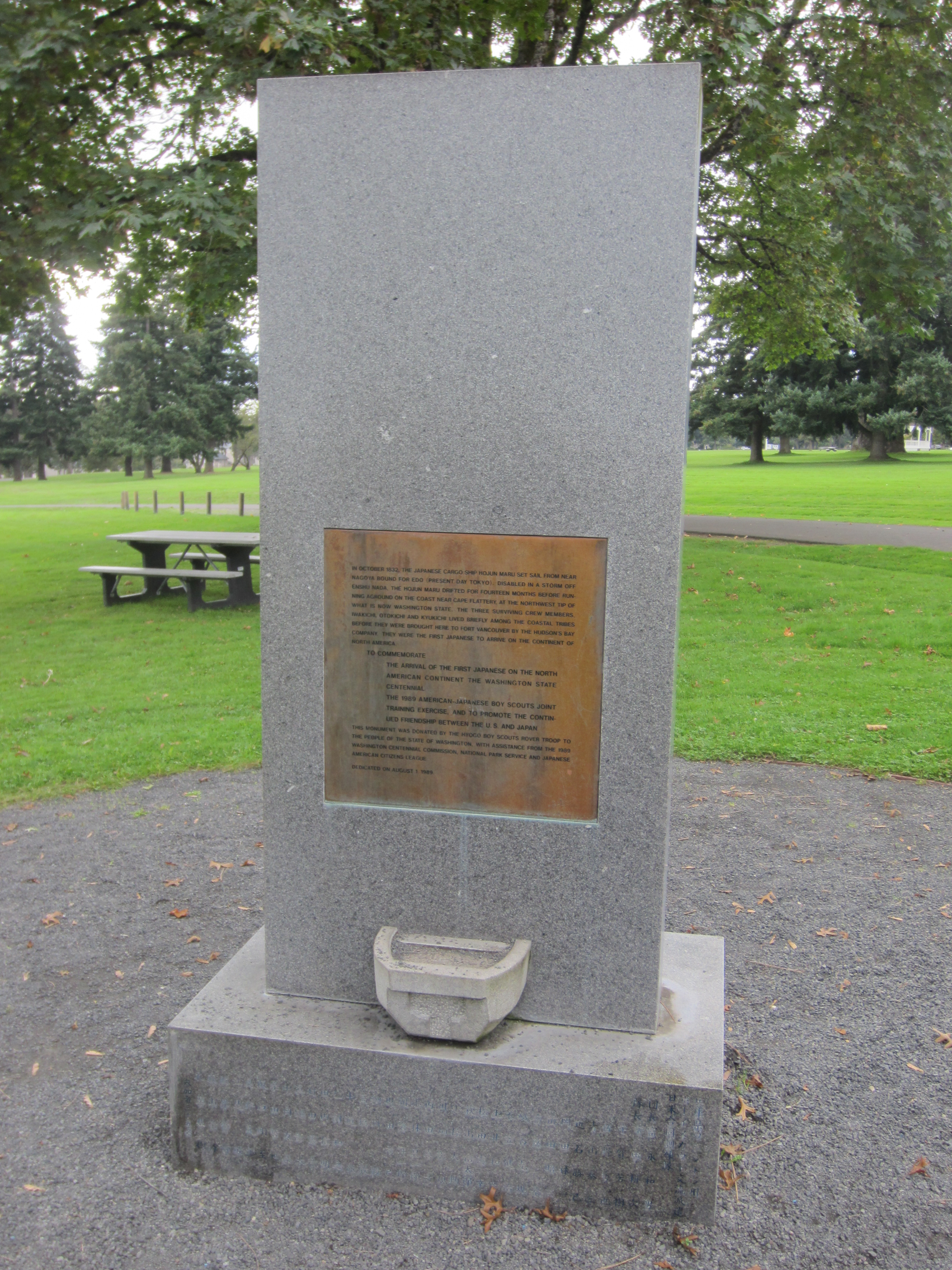

== See also ==
- 1989 in art
