= John L. Morrison (pioneer) =

John Lindsey Morrison (May 1819 – December 21, 1899) arrived in Oregon Country in 1842 along with other famous Oregon pioneers Medorem Crawford, Asa Lovejoy, and Sidney Moss, in the same wagon train. Morrison built the home of Francis Pettygrove in early Portland, Oregon, in 1846. The street on which Pettygrove's house was located was named in honor of Morrison. The first Morrison Street Bridge (built in 1887), crossing the Willamette River into East Portland, has been said to be named after Morrison, but alternatively it has been stated that the bridge simply took the name of the street that had been named for Morrison.

Born in Scotland in May 1819, Morrison emigrated to Connecticut in 1831 and learned carpentry. Coming to the Oregon Country in 1842, Morrison worked as a carpenter for the Methodist Mission in 1843 and later in Oregon City, where he gained a reputation for being meticulous in his work. Morrison built several houses in the Portland area and Oregon City with the most famous surviving structure being the Barclay House in Oregon City. In the 1850s, Morrison moved to the San Juan Islands, where he lived until his death.

His obituary in The San Juan Islander stated that he was born in Pennsylvania to Scottish parents, but other sources say he was born in Scotland in 1819 and emigrated to the U.S. in 1831. He died on December 21, 1899, at his home near Griswold, Shaw Island, San Juan County, Washington. He is buried at Valley Cemetery, Friday Harbor, San Juan County, Washington.
