= The Pioneer Mother Memorial =

Bronze sculpture by Avard Fairbanks in Vancouver, Washington, U.S.

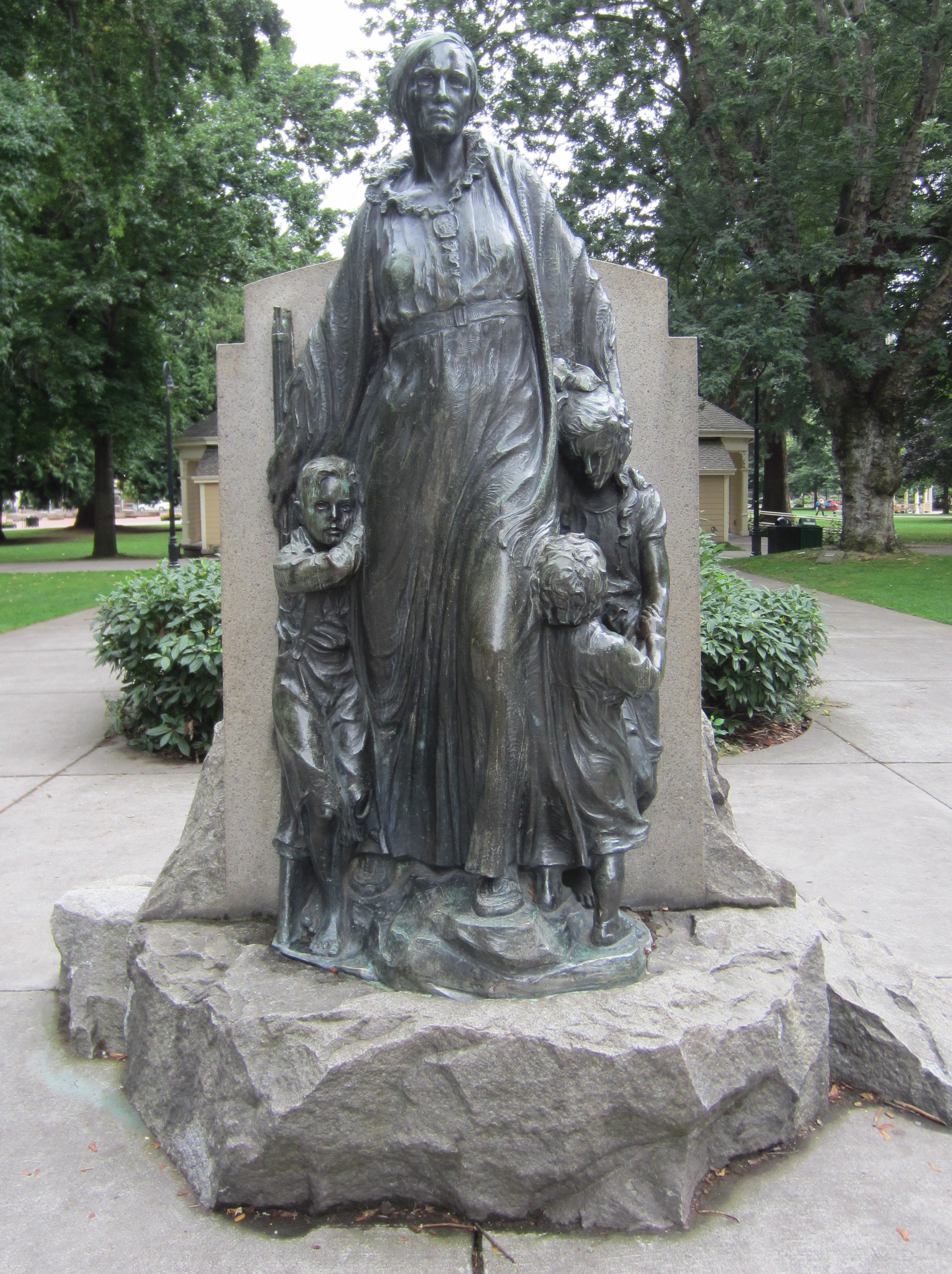
- The memorial sculpture in 2013
- Artist: Avard Fairbanks
- Year: 1928
- Medium: Sculpture: Bronze; Medallion: Bronze; Base: Concrete, granite
- Subject: Pioneer mother and children
- Condition: Renovated c. 2000
- Location: Vancouver, Washington, United States; 45.62708°N 122.674929°W

The Pioneer Mother Memorial, also known as Pioneer Mother and Pioneer Mothers, is a 1928 bronze sculpture by American artist Avard Fairbanks, installed at Esther Short Park in Vancouver, Washington, in the United States. The memorial depicts a mother and three children, and commemorates pioneer mothers who settled in the Pacific Northwest. The main female figure may depict Esther Short, one of the first U.S. citizens to arrive in Fort Vancouver. Commissioned by Vancouver banker Edward Crawford and his wife Ida for $10,000, it is one of the city's oldest works of public art, acquired in 1928 and unveiled in 1929. The sculpture was renovated around the start of the 21st century and is maintained by the City of Vancouver's Parks & Recreation department.

== Description ==
The Pioneer Mother Memorial is installed at Esther Short Park's north entrance, at the intersection of West 8th and Daniel Street (between Columbia and Esther Streets) in Vancouver, Washington. The park commemorates the pioneer woman and her husband Amos, who were among the first U.S. citizens to arrive in Fort Vancouver. Some sources say the memorial sculpture commemorates Esther Short specifically, while also "[typifying] all the brave mothers of the frontier" who settled in the Pacific Northwest. Some sources say the sculpture's main female figure is Short herself, per the dedication ceremony's program. The sculpture was cast in Florence, Italy, where Fairbanks was working on his Guggenheim Fellowship.

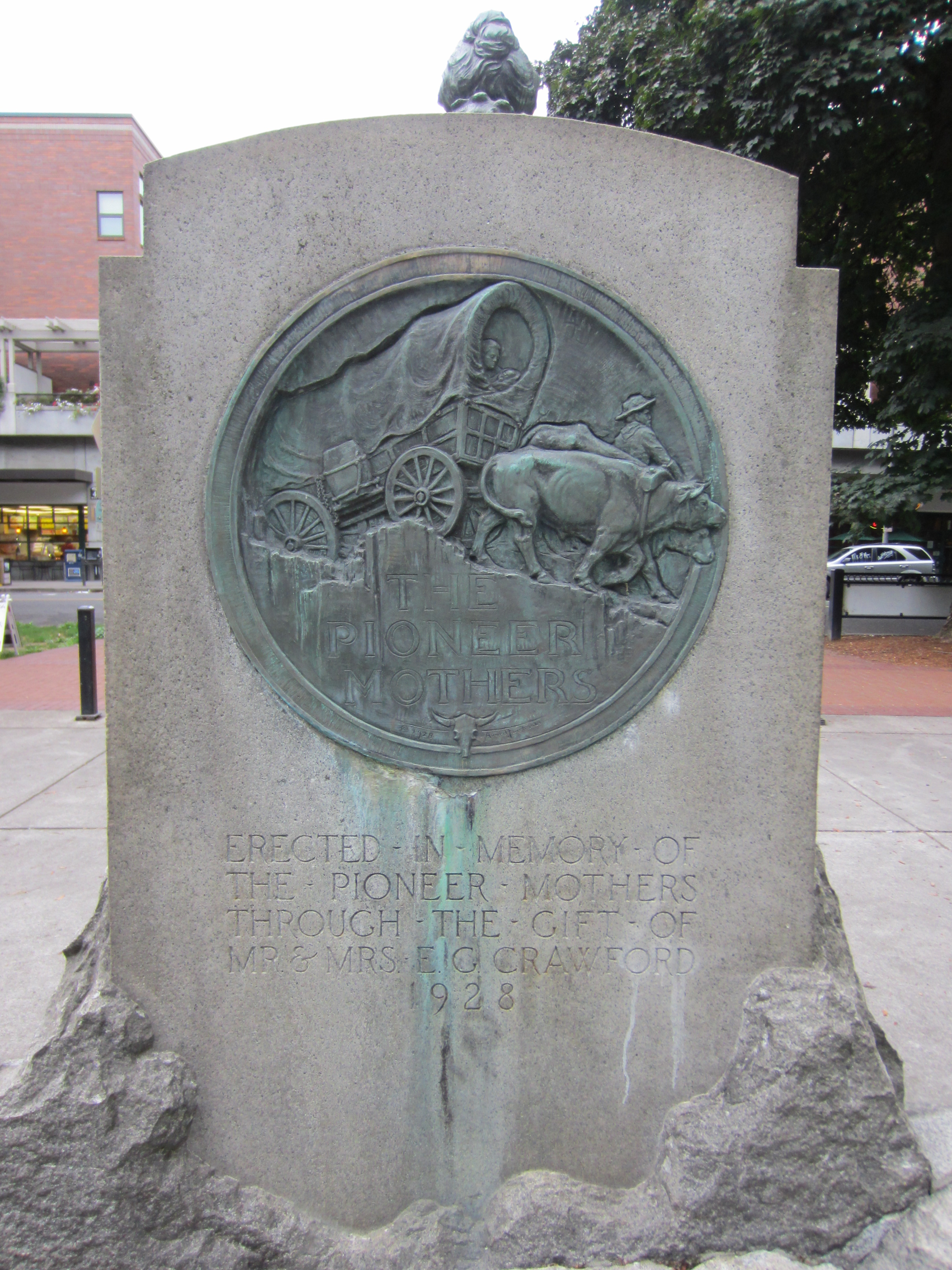
Bronze medallion on the backdrop's reverse side

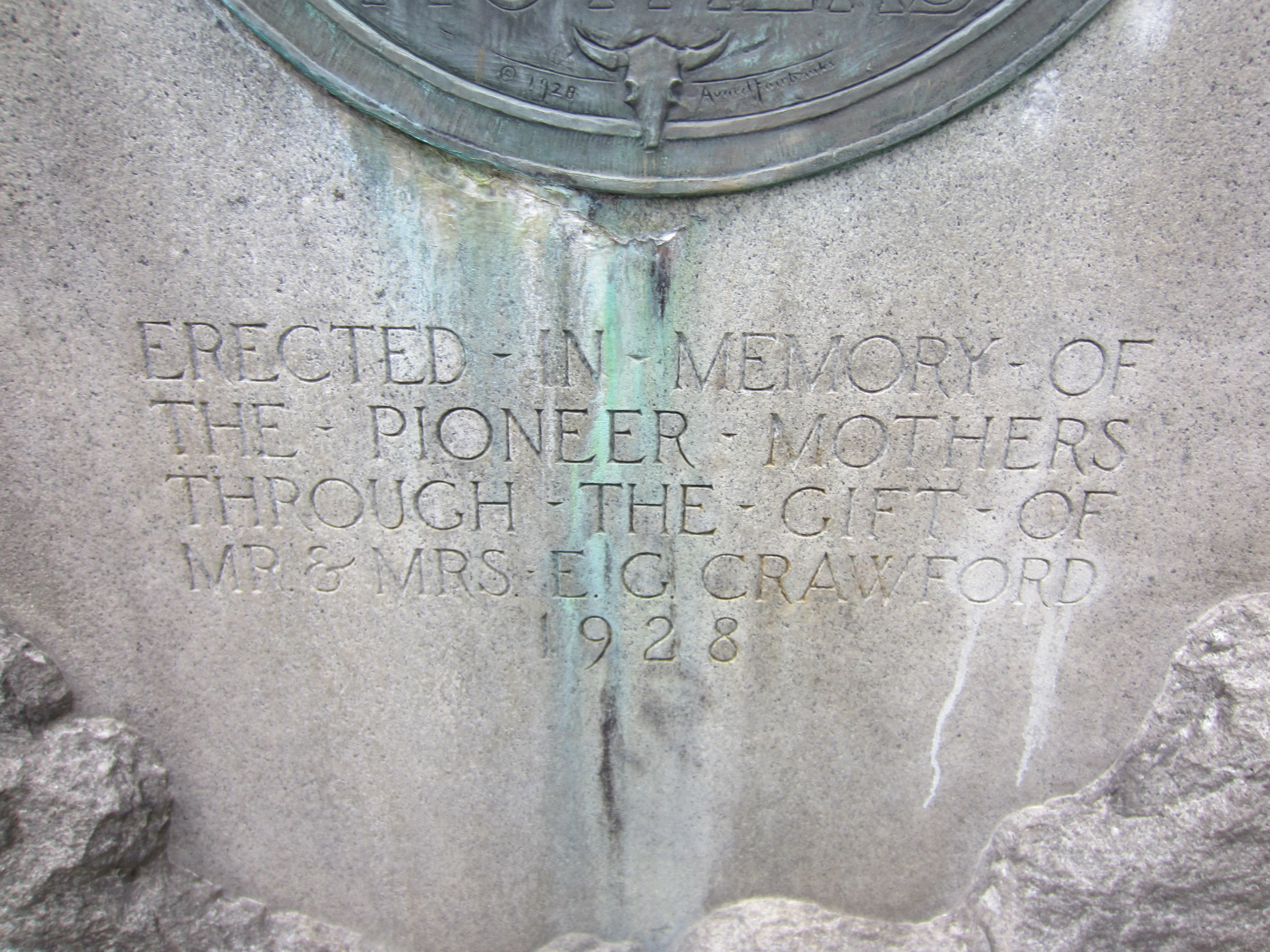
Inscription below the medallion

The memorial features a full-length bronze figure depicting a mother and three children. The woman wears traditional pioneer clothing, including a long dress, shawl, and shoes. She stands, facing forward, and holds a flintlock rifle in her proper right hand. The woman's opposite hand rests on the head of the taller of two girls at her proper left side. The taller girl holds the shorter one with her proper left hand, while the shorter girl faces the taller one and rests against the mother's proper left knee. A young boy clings to the mother's dress and leans against her rifle. The sculpture measures approximately 7 feet (2.1 m) × 3 feet (0.91 m) × 21 inches (53 cm) and rests on a concrete and granite base that measures approximately 102 inches (2.6 m) × 18 feet (5.5 m) × 15 feet (4.6 m).

Behind the figure group is a concrete backdrop. Its reverse side includes a bronze medallion with a bas-relief depicting a team of oxen pulling a covered wagon. The animals are led by a man, and an "anxious" woman and baby are in the wagon. A large barrel is attached to the wagon. The bottom of the medallion includes a relief of a cattle skull. The medallion has a diameter of approximately 36 inches (91 cm).

The memorial includes several inscriptions. One by the woman's foot reads, Avard Fairbanks / 1928. The medallion has two inscriptions: one below the wagon displays a copyright symbol and reads, 1928 Avard Fairbanks, while another says, THE / PIONEER / MOTHERS. On the concrete backdrop below the medallion is the signed inscription: ERECTED IN MEMORY OF / THE PIONEER MOTHERS / THROUGH THE GIFT OF / MR. & MRS. E. G. CRAWFORD / 1928.

== History ==
The Pioneer Mother Memorial is one of Vancouver's oldest works of public art (the oldest, according to the Clark County Historical Museum), acquired in 1928 and unveiled on July 21, 1929 (or September 7, according to some sources). Fairbanks attended the ceremony. The artist was commissioned to create the memorial by Vancouver banker Edward Crawford and his wife Ida, who donated $10,000 to its creation.

The work was classified as needing treatment by the Smithsonian Institution's "Save Outdoor Sculpture!" program in May 1995. It was renovated as part of park improvement efforts around the start of the 21st century. The memorial is maintained by the City of Vancouver's Parks & Recreation department.

== See also ==
- 1928 in art
- Pioneer Mothers Memorial Cabin Museum, near St. Paul, Oregon
- The Pioneer Mother (Eugene, Oregon) by Alexander Phimister Proctor (1932)
