= LGBTQ culture in Puerto Vallarta =

LGBTQ+ culture in Puerto Vallarta, Mexico

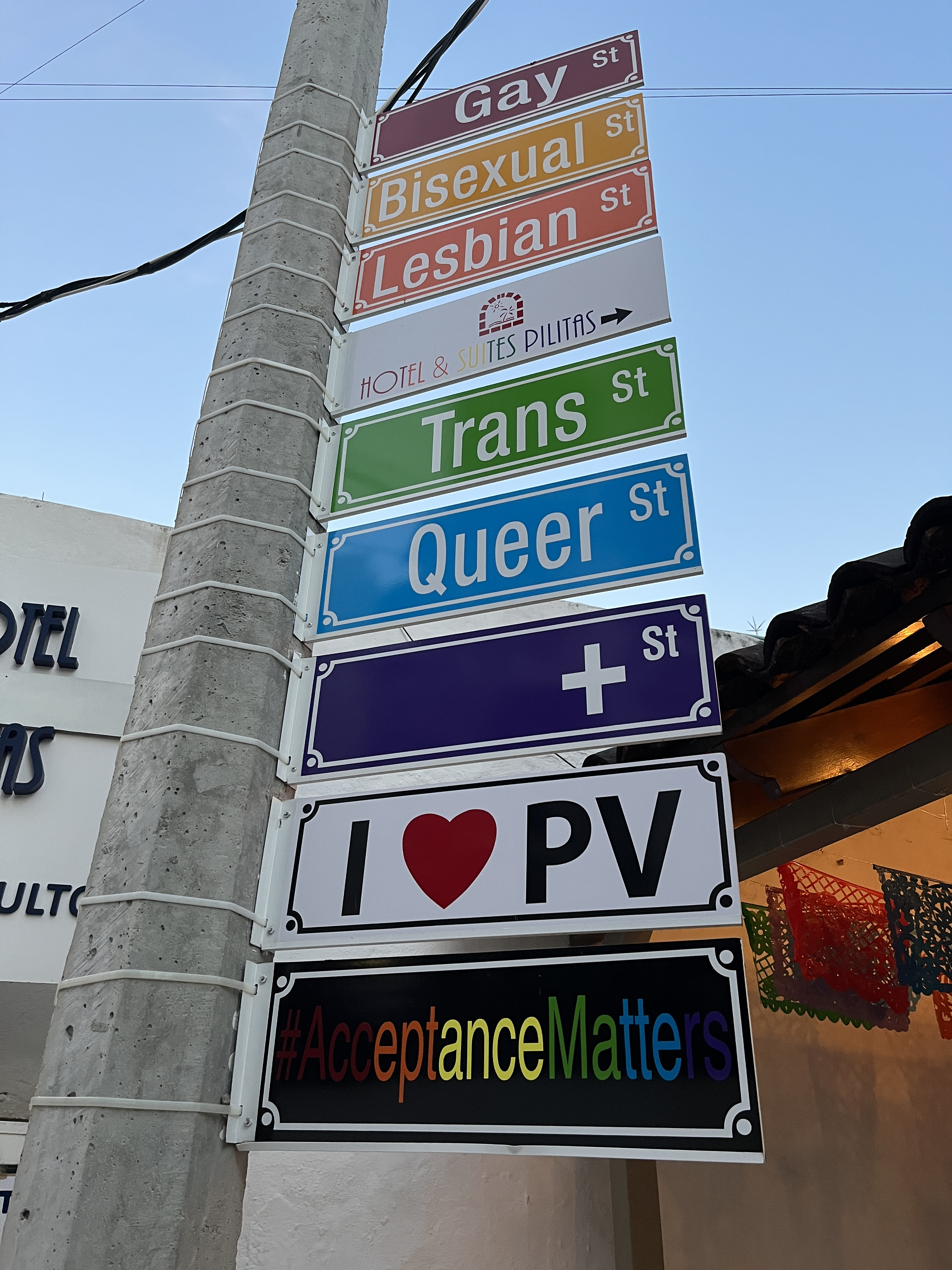
Sign in Puerto Vallarta recognizing the LGBTQ community, 2023

The city of Puerto Vallarta in Jalisco, Mexico, is a popular destination for LGBTQ+ tourists. CNN has described Puerto Vallarta as Mexico's "top LGBT destination" with "one of the best week-long Pride festivals in the world". According to The Independent, the city is "the gay capital of Mexico, with a whole district of hotels and restaurants catering to the LGBT+ community". Puerto Vallarta's LGBTQ culture is based in the Zona Romántica, which includes the gay-friendly Playa de los Muertos.

Puerto Vallarta, especially Zona Romántica, has many businesses catering to the LGBTQ community, including beach clubs, bars and nightclubs, gay bathhouses and strip clubs, hotels, and performance venues. The city has private clinics and nonprofit organizations specializing in LGBTQ healthcare and providing access to pre-exposure prophylaxis (PrEP).

Puerto Vallarta's pride parade attracts thousands annually. The city hosts other LGBTQ-friendly events such as circuit parties and the annual Beef Dip Bear Week, which caters to the bear community. Puerto Vallarta has been recognized as a safe destination for LGBTQ travelers but has not gone without violence against LGBTQ people.

== LGBTQ tourism ==
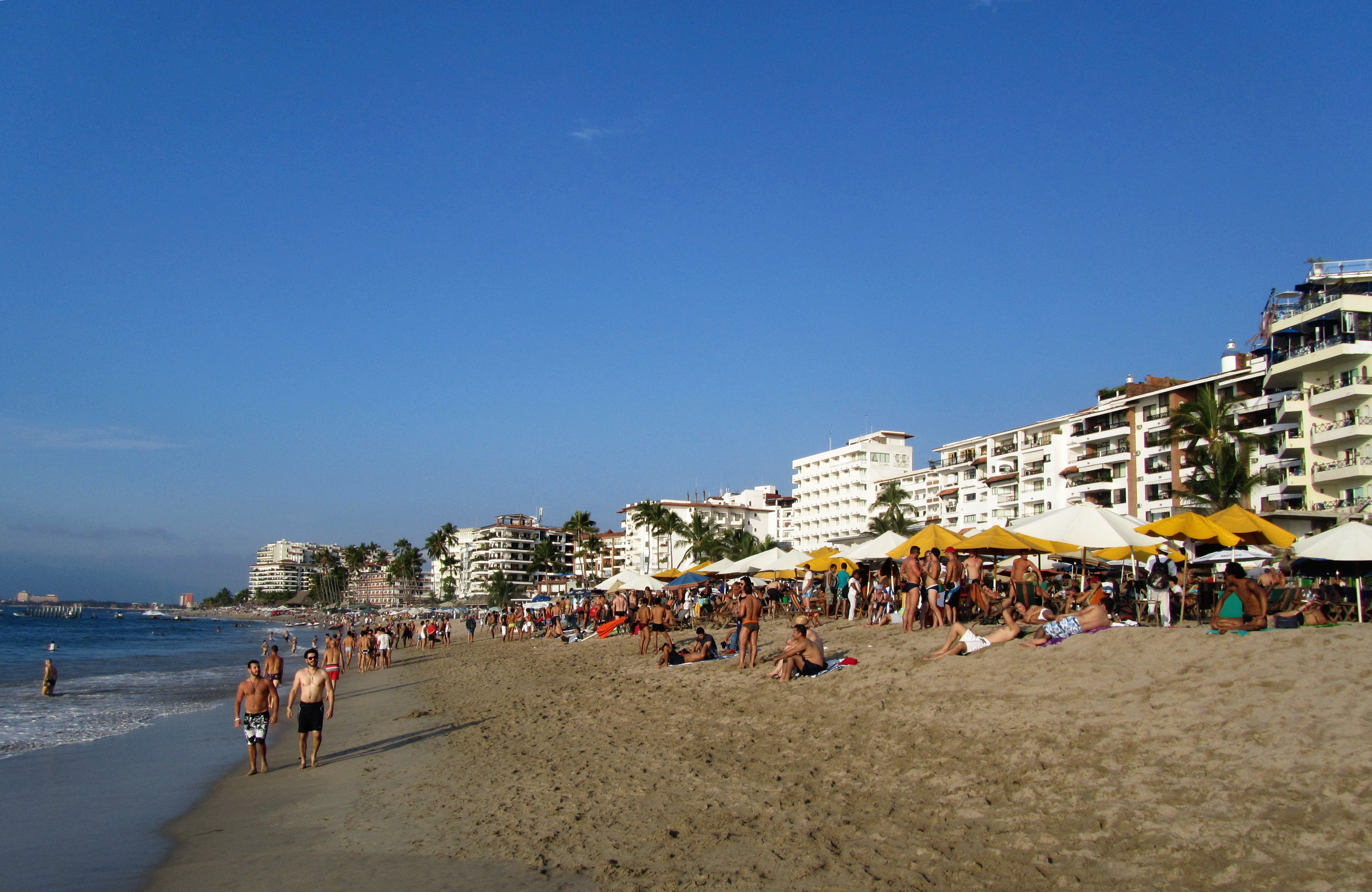
Gay-friendly part of Playa de los Muertos in Zona Romántica

In 2016, The New York Times' Ondine Cohane said Puerto Vallarta was among the most LGBTQ-friendly destinations "south of the border". In 2023, Lola Mendez of The Times said one fifth of visitors are LGBTQ and wrote, "Gay travellers have been visiting Puerto Vallarta since the 1960s and have dubbed Zona Romántica, where Vallarta Pride is held, the 'gayborhood'." The Yucatán Times called the city "super-gay" in 2019.

In 2014, Jennifer Polland included Puerto Vallarta and nearby Punta Mita in Business Insider's list of the twelve "best honeymoon destinations for gay couples", and Gareth Rubin included Puerto Vallarta in CNN's list of "great locations for a same-sex honeymoon". In 2018, Bill Malcolm of the Windy City Times called Puerto Vallarta "arguably the most gay-friendly city in North America" and wrote: "Think Boystown combined with the French Quarter in New Orleans: cobblestone streets, a great bar area and wonderful beaches." Writing for South Florida Gay News in 2020, he called Puerto Vallarta "the premiere [sic] LGBT resort in North America". Readers of OutSmart selected the city as a favorite LGBTQ travel and honeymoon destination.

Puerto Vallarta's LGBTQ culture is based in Zona Romántica, which offers a gay beach experience and businesses catering to the LGBTQ community. According to John Gottberg Anderson of The Bulletin, "a lot of the romance in [Zona Romantica] is of the gay and lesbian variety, as this subculture is widely accepted here". According to the Bay Area Reporter, "The gay village ... is centered around the intersection of Lazaro Cardenas and Ignacio L. Vallarta." The southern end of the neighborhood's Playa de los Muertos is considered gay-friendly and is popular with LGBTQ travelers. SFGATE said, "the most popular beach for gays is the area south of the pier and just north of" the sculpture The Boy on the Seahorse.

== Businesses and organizations ==
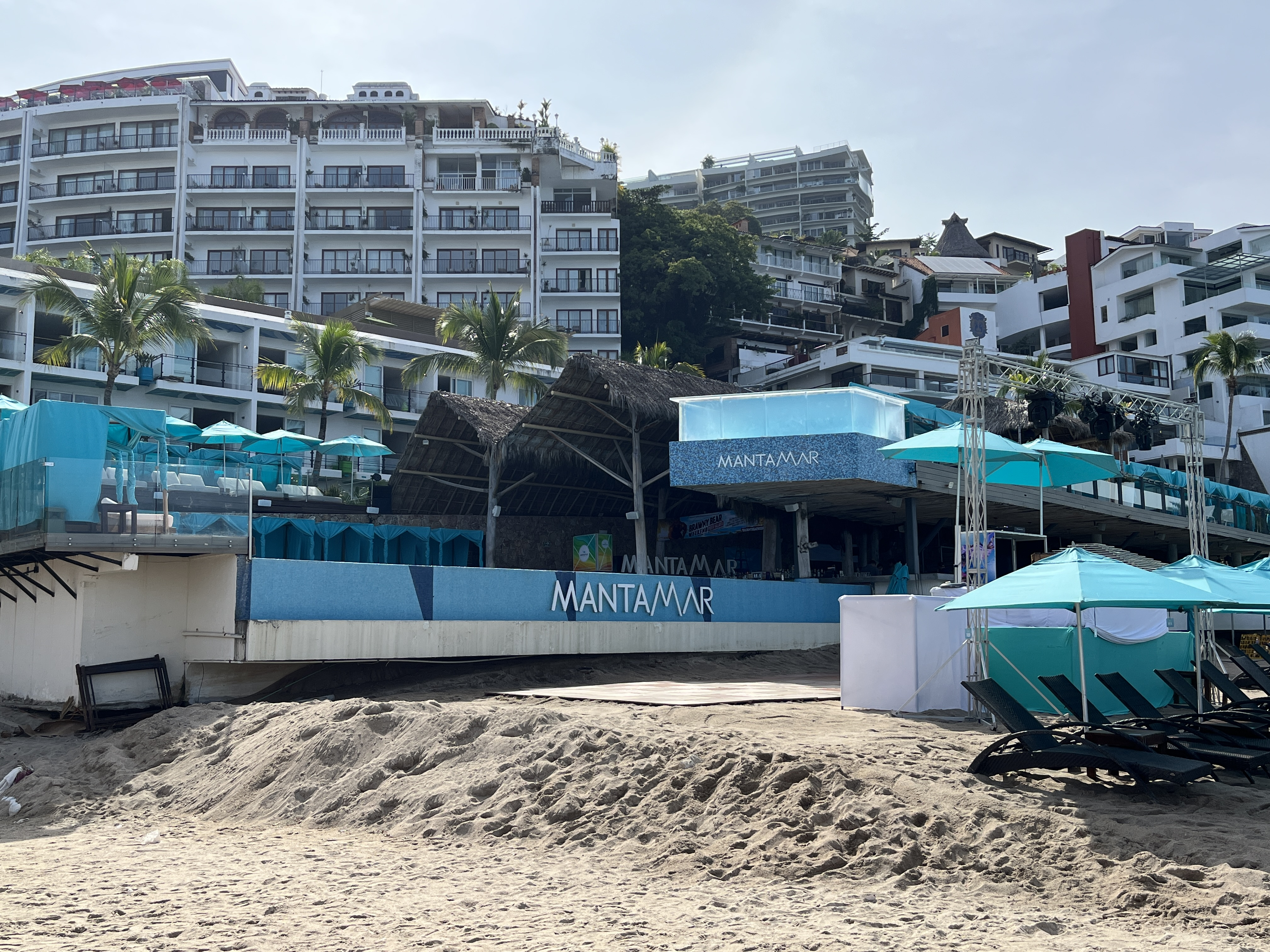
Mantamar Beach Club Bar & Sushi at Playa de los Muertos, 2022

Puerto Vallarta has many businesses that cater to the LGBTQ community, especially in Zona Romántica and to a much-lesser extent in neighboring Centro. According to the Canadian LGBTQ newspaper Daily Xtra, "there are around thirty gay bars and nightclubs at any given time, many gay-friendly cafes and restaurants, and over a dozen gay hotels and bed-and-breakfasts".

Blue Chairs Resort by the Sea, Mantamar Beach Club Bar & Sushi, and Ritmos Beach Cafe (nicknamed "Green Chairs") are beach clubs along Playa de los Muertos. Boat excursions have included the lesbian-operated Diana's Tours and a more "sexually-charged" tour by Wet and Wild Cruise. Jet's and Wet and Wild offer "coastal tours that conclude with a secluded, clothing-optional beach party", according to Out magazine.

=== Bars, nightclubs, and restaurants ===
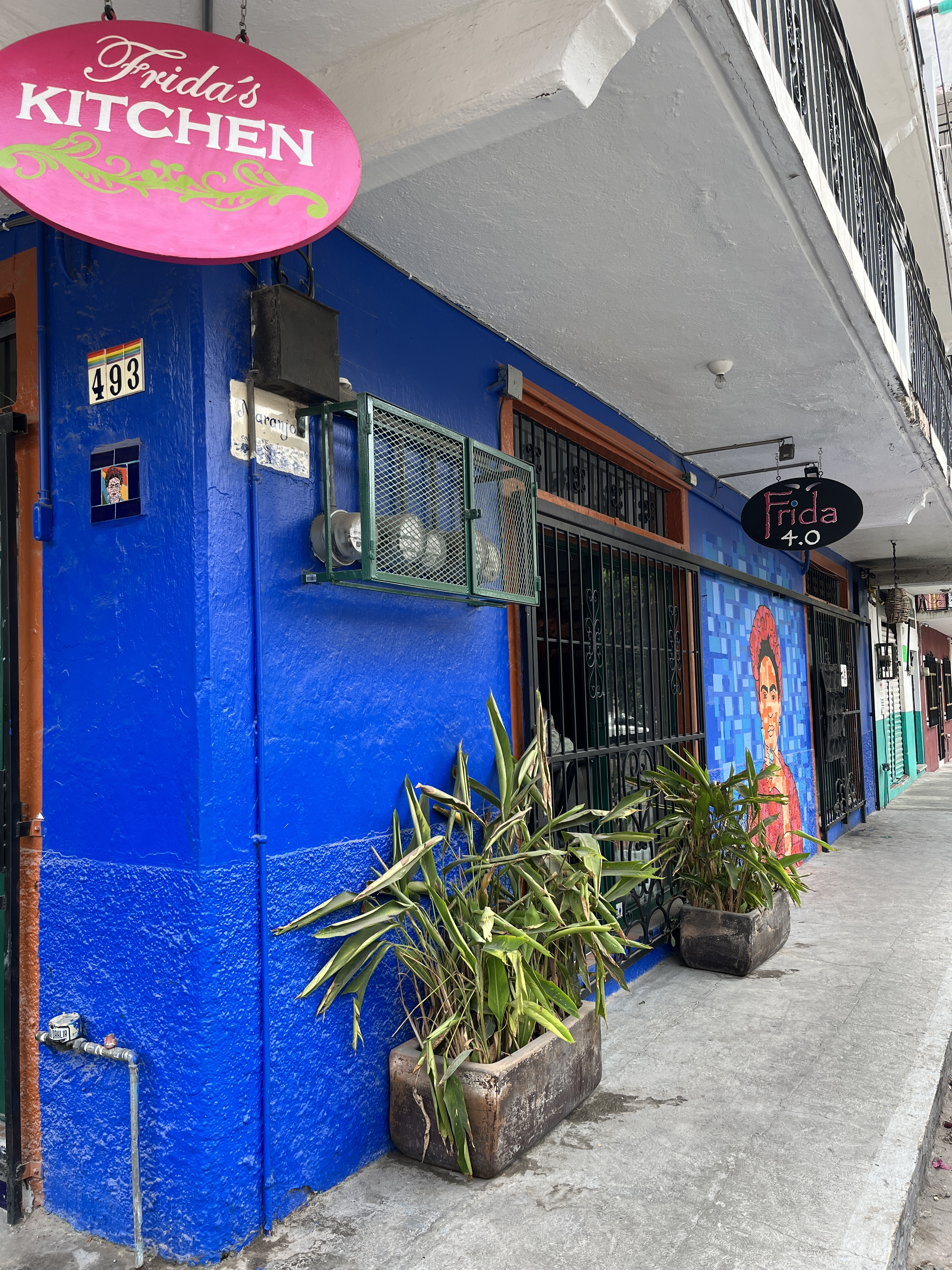
Bar Frida

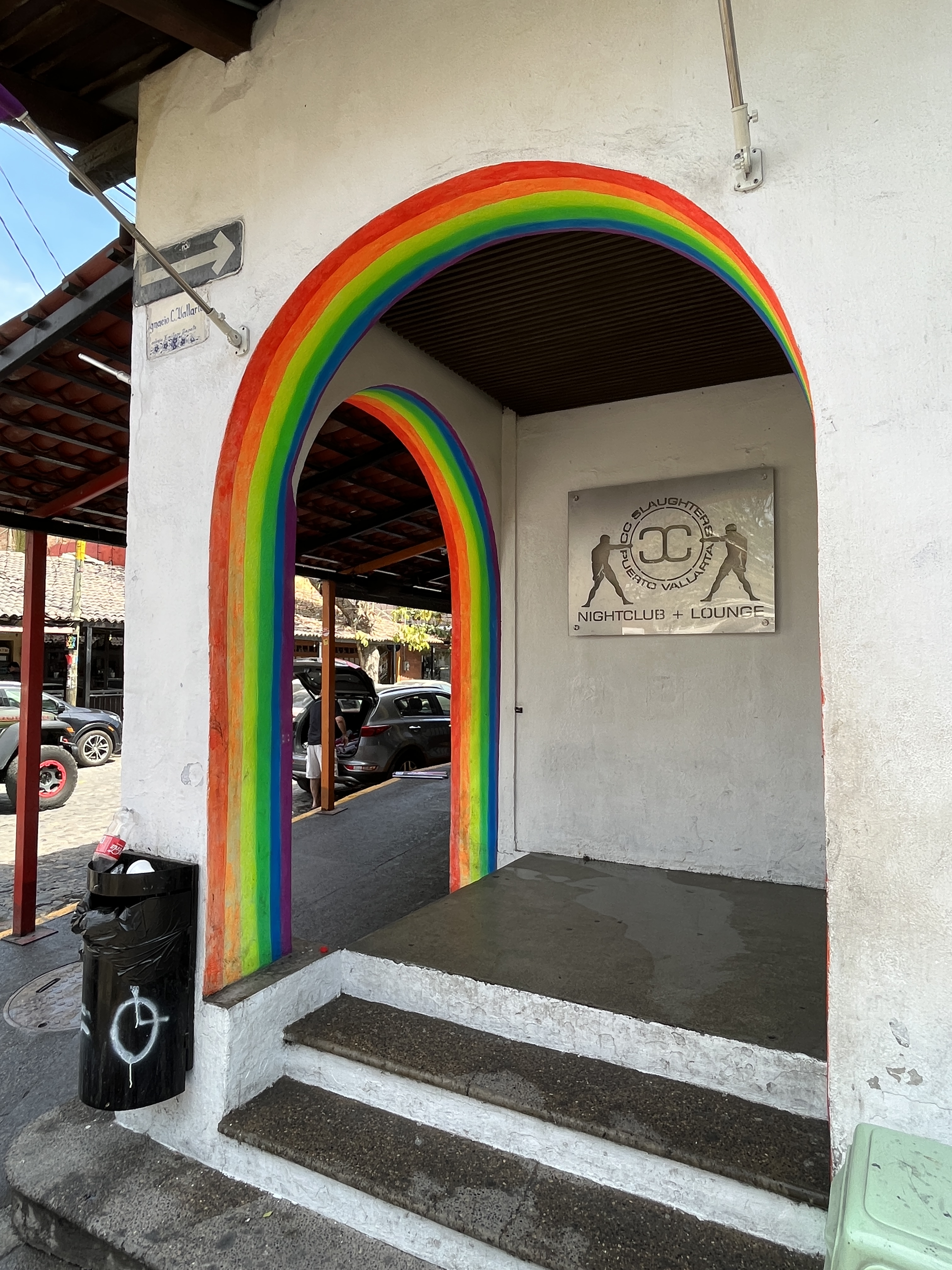
CC Slaughters

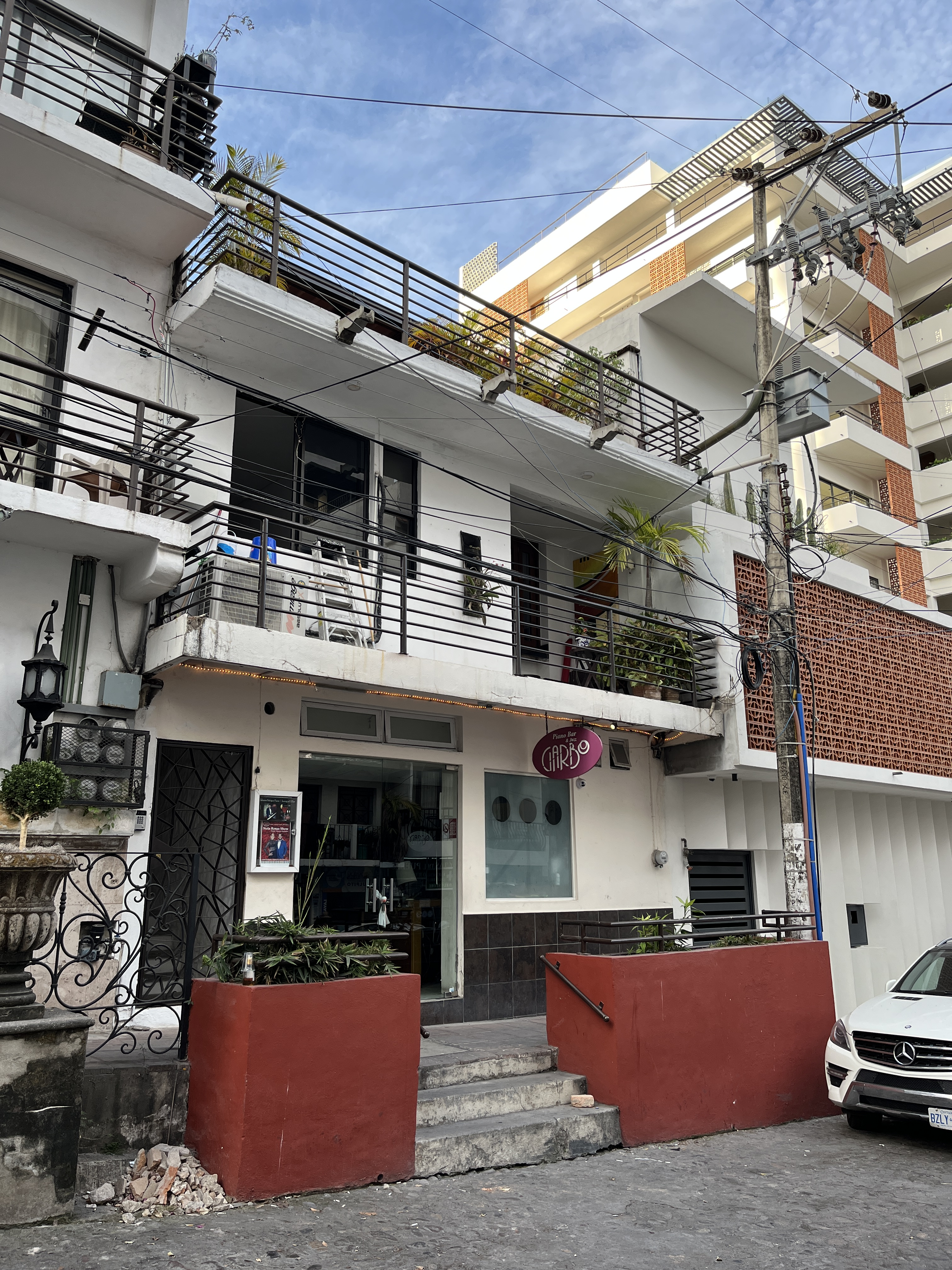
Garbo

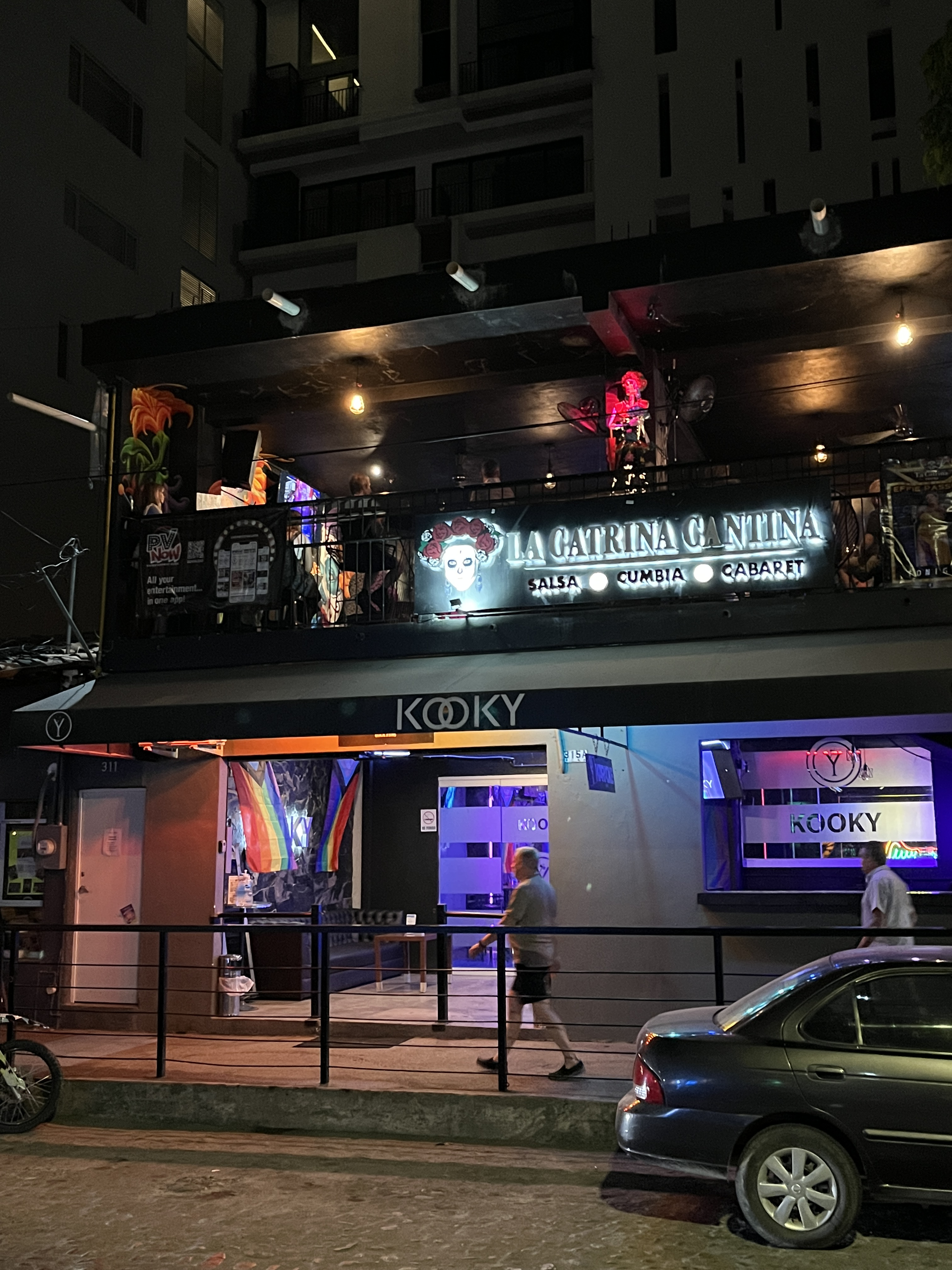
La Catrina Cantina

In 2020, Jim Malcolm of the Washington Blade said Zona Romántica had 32 LGBTQ bars "that are quite varied". Many are located along Lázaro Cardenas and Olas Altas. Notable gay bars and LGBTQ-friendly nightclubs include Bar Frida, CC Slaughters, Garbo, La Catrina Cantina, La Noche, Mr. Flamingo, Paco's Ranch, and Reinas Bar. Paco's Ranch was established as Club Paco Paco in 1989. The owner of Paco's Ranch has been credited for influencing the perception of the LGBTQ community locally. Daily Xtra said:

The city's gay evolution began ... when Paco Ruiz opened his namesake gay nightclub, Club Paco Paco ... At the time, there was only one other gay bar in town. Despite being arrested three times, Ruiz refused to be intimidated by the police harassment. Eventually the media attention and public sympathy that followed created a friendlier environment for his and other gay businesses.

Anónimo has been described as a three-level video bar. The small, lesbian-owned bar Apaches is on Olas Altas. Described as "popular with gay women" in 2007, the bar is generally busier early evenings. The Rough Guide to Mexico describes Apaches as a "popular and welcoming gay and lesbian joint where groups gather for martinis and cocktails at happy hour, filling the cosy, indoor bar and sidewalk tables". In 2007, Bench and Bar was described as "a popular showcase for local gay-centric entertainment", and Budda Lounge was a lesbian-owned bar and restaurant popular with gay women. Blondies PV has an outpost called Los Otros Blondies. Out described Code as "more of an LGBTQ-inclusive space with a Vegas vibe; spheres drop from the ceiling and change color while flames shoot from the DJ booth". El Secreto de la Muxe hosts drag shows. Elixir Mixology has been described as "a lesbian-owned bar and safe space for queer women".

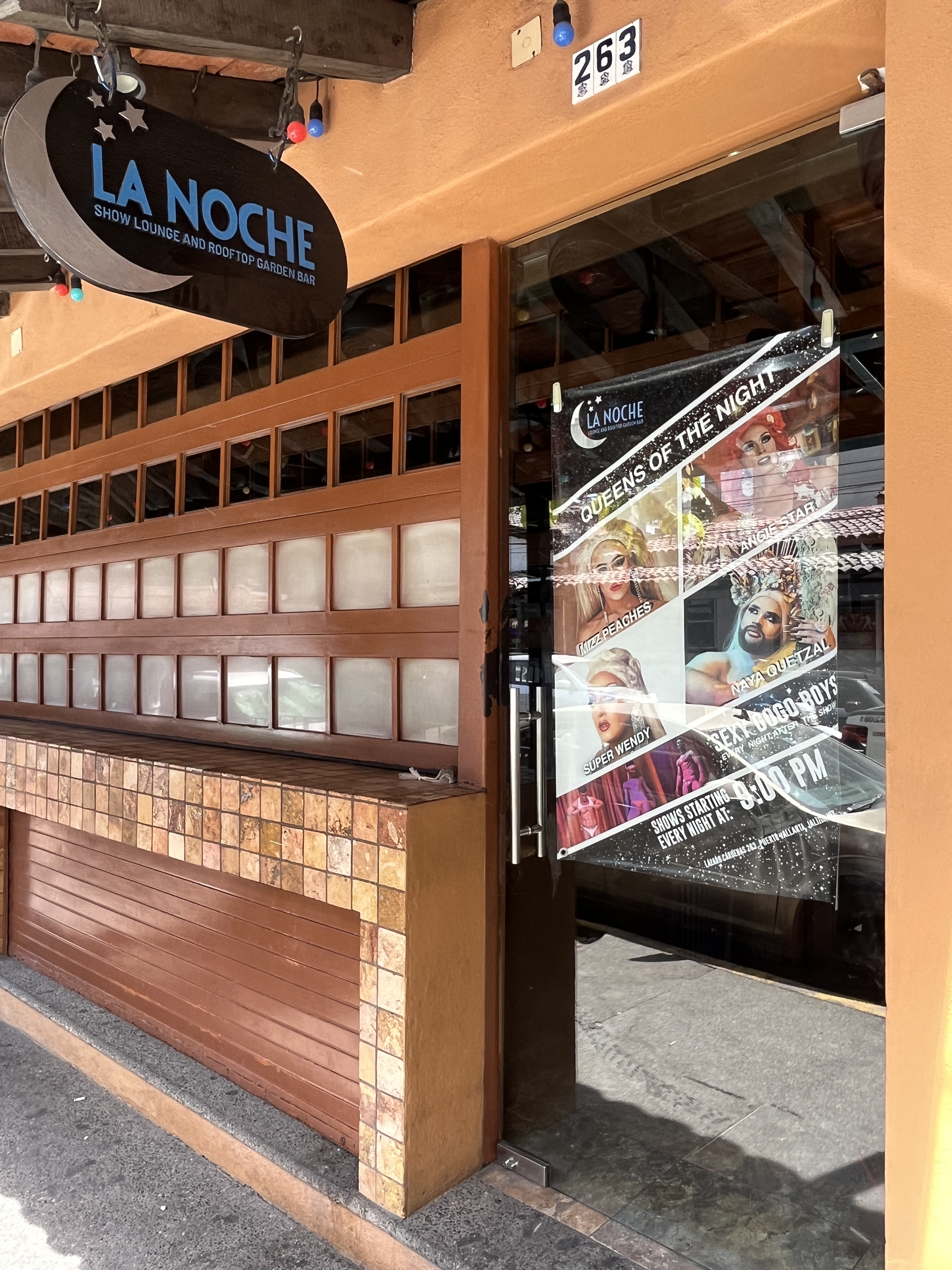
La Noche

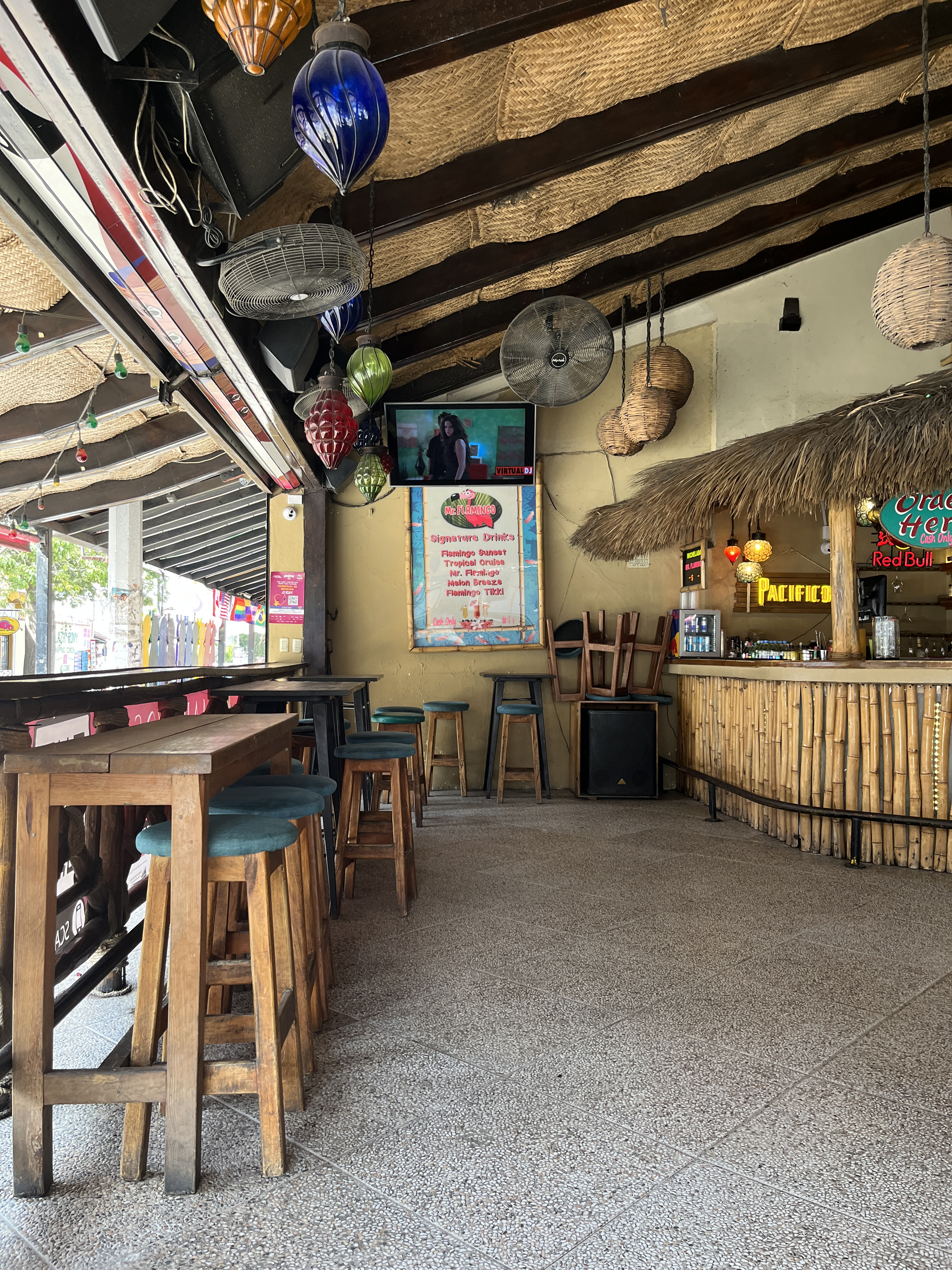
Mr. Flamingo

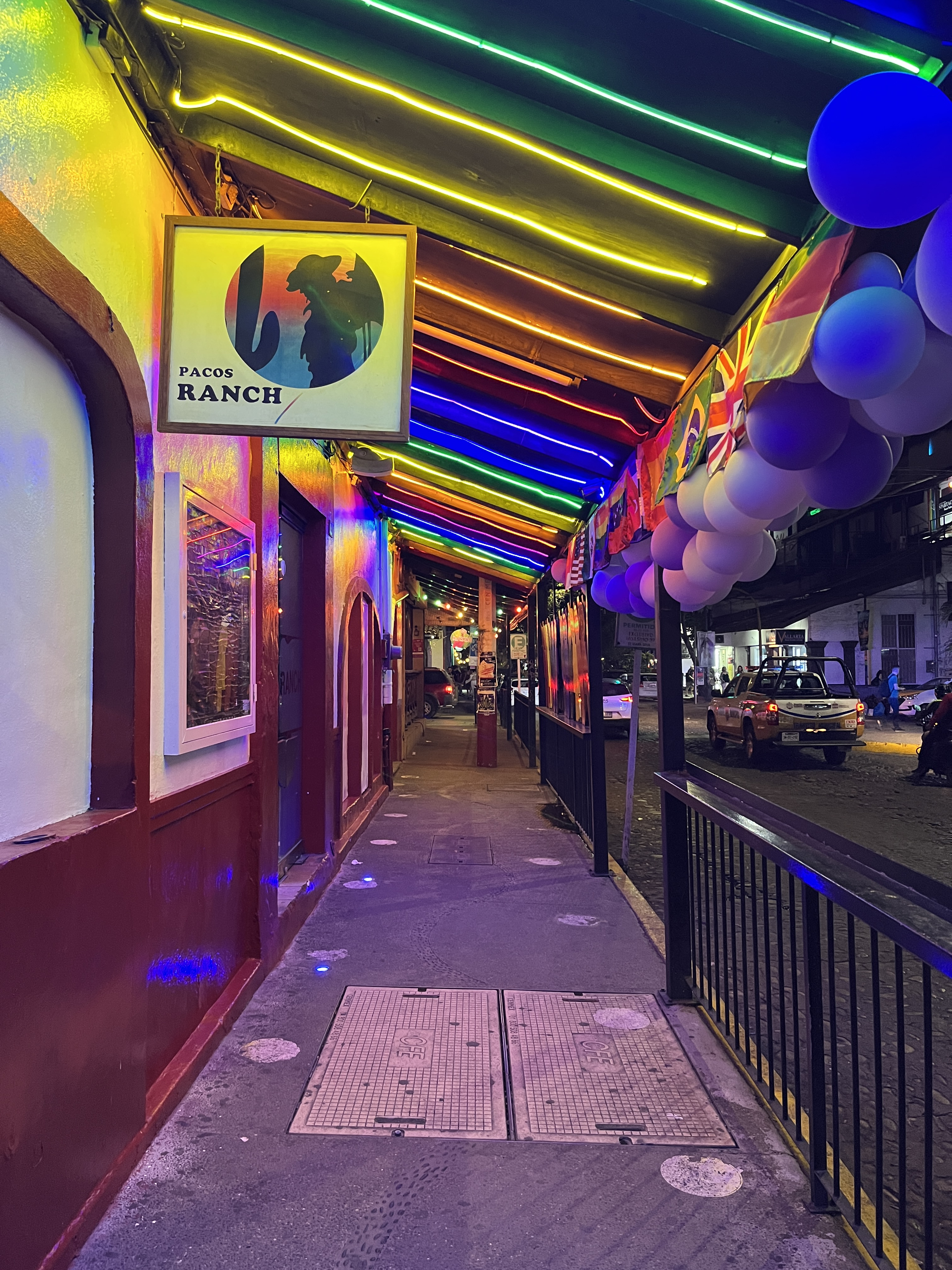
Paco's Ranch

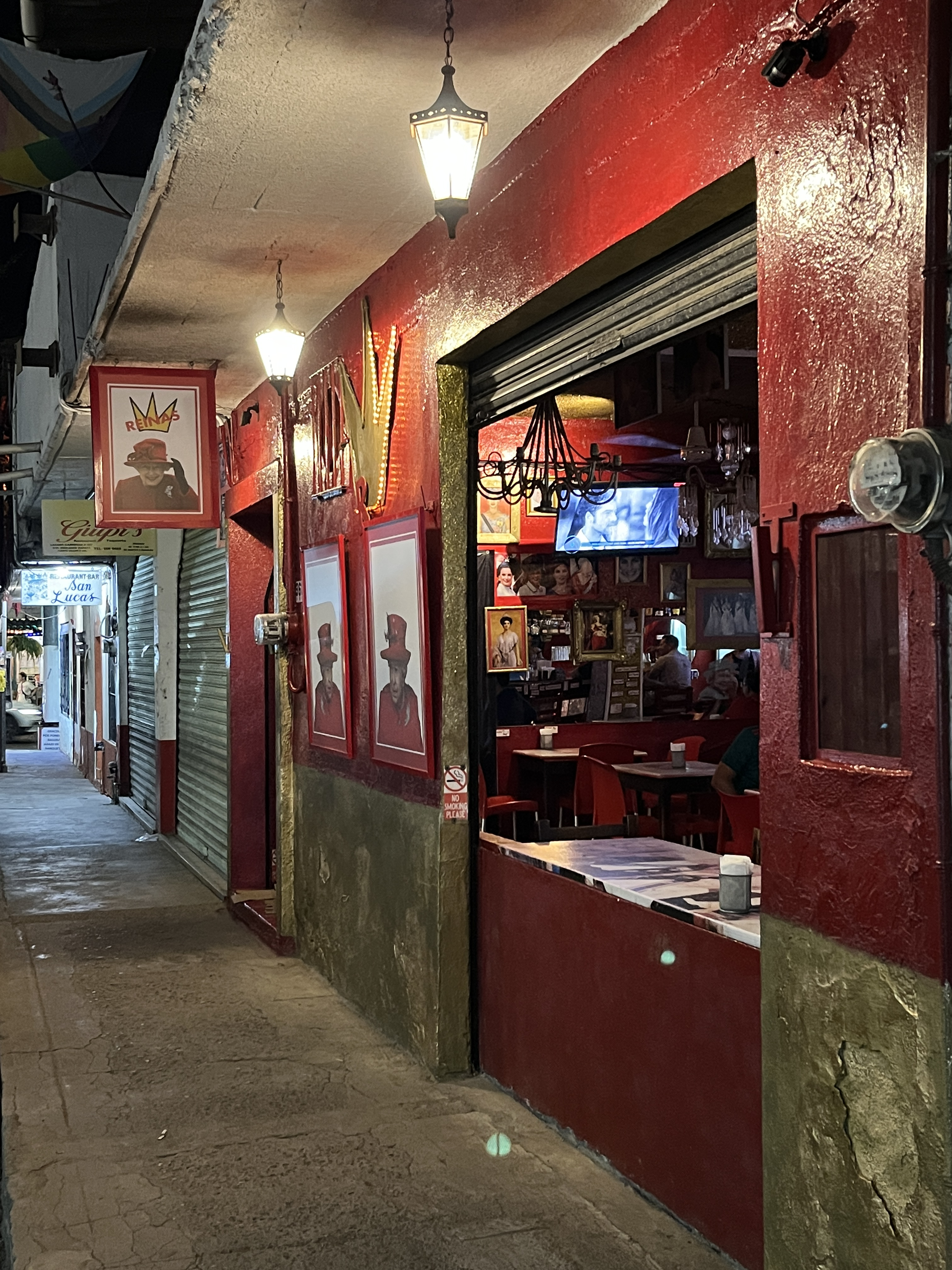
Reinas Bar

Hotel Mercurio Bar, nicknamed "Jorge's Bar" after its longtime bartender, is housed in the gay-friendly Hotel Mercurio. According to Out, dance club Industry "plays pop favorites in its main bar. During circuit season, the back room pounds with house music and often requires a cover". PinkNews has said La Cantina Margarita is "probably the most relaxed and grown-up gay bar" in Zona Romántica. The gay bar La ChaChaLaCa, which was established as StreetBar Vallarta in late 2016, has a pride flag near the entrance and a patio wall gallery displaying "Hollywood divas". Lesbian-owned Los Equipales Grill was described as possibly the city's "most Mexican gay bar" in 2007, and was popular among gay men. Nox is a gay bar with a stripper night, and One Six One is a craft cocktail lounge. Out described Qulture as "a courtyard bar with art galleries featuring LGBTQ+ artists". The popular Top Sky Bar is part of Almar Resort, along with Mantamar.

Other establishments have included Blue Diamond Bar (or simply Blue), Desmadre Bar, Divas, the gay bar Freedom, Kooky Karaoke, La Cueva Cantina, Mixer Bar, Sama, and Sanctuary PV. Several bars have catered to the bear and leather communities. The bear-oriented Diablitos Cantina opened on Basilio Badillo in 2023. No Borders, in Centro, has been described a "bear/leather/cowboy" bar. Studs has been described as the city's first "men-only bear and leather bar".

In 2020, during the COVID-19 pandemic, Brian Kent Productions and Vallarta Pride hosted the livestream event PV Strong to benefit employees of LGBTQ nightlife establishments via the Puerto Vallarta Nightlife Relief Fund. According to organizers, the online event was "the only Official Vallarta Pride event happening instead of originally planned 2020 events that have been cancelled". Participants included Brooke Lynn Hytes, Eliad Cohen, Hedda Lettuce, Levi Kreis, Kim Kuzma, Mama Tits, Ross Mathews, Nina Flowers, Shangela, Sherry Vine, Valentina, and Varla Jean Merman. Recipient businesses included Blondies, Garbo, La Noche, Mantamar, Mr. Flamingo, Reinas, The Top, and Wet.

==== Defunct ====
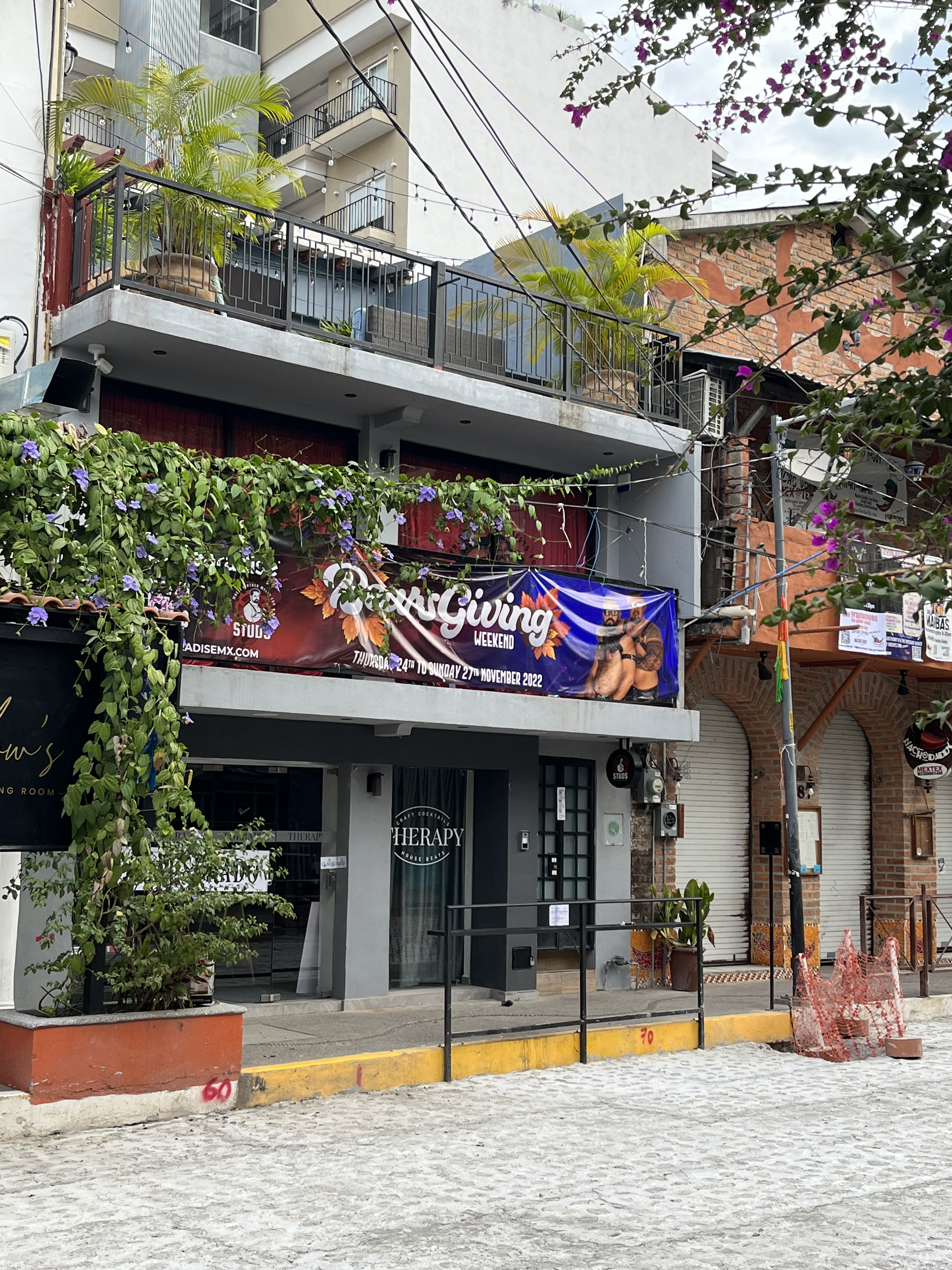
2022 photograph of Studs (second level), which expanded to two floors after Therapy (street level) closed

Among the city's earliest LGBTQ-friendly establishments were Piano Bar and Centro's Los Balcones. The owner of Bar Frida has said Piano Bar was not "officially" gay, but was popular with the "Hollywood crowd". According to SFGate, Los Balcones was lesbian-owned and "may have been the second-oldest gay bar after the Piano Bar, which dates back to the 1980s". The Observer said Los Balcones' dance floor was "opulent Mexican art deco, overlooked by an all-white, hi-tech chill-out room". The gay bar Crema later operated in the Los Balcones space for "just a few days".

The two-level Aria, located on Pino Suárez and known for its happy hour, closed in 2001. Among other defunct establishments are Candy Bar and Club Mañana, which opened in 2005 and was once the city's most popular gay club. The cantina Los Equipales (2010–2016) operated in the space occupied by Kooky. It hosted karaoke and was popular among local gays and lesbians. NYPV had a large dance floor and a 15-foot-tall bust of the Statue of Liberty. It only operated from March to November 2004. Plasma (2006–2009) has been described as "a combination of two adjacent properties, a laid back bar on one side, and a more sexy, stripper, go go boys vibe on the other side". As of 2007, Plasma had a dark room and was popular among the bear and leather communities. Stereo was described as a "high-tech video lounge bar" in 2007. Zotano opened in 1995, and was replaced by Por Que No / Why Not? in 1997. In the space now occupied by the male strip club Antropology, Por Que No / Why Not? hosted strippers and operated until early 2001.

In 2023, a writer for a local LGBTQ publication said the Great Recession (late 2000s) "took out many of the older bars that just could not survive", including Amor, Bite Me Beach Club, Casanovas, Club Mañana, Deja Vecu, El Pianito, Freedom PV, Kit Kat, KokoHome Club, Kox, La Bola, Los Balcones, Miseria, Picante, Plasma/Club Zenit, Stereo, Stonewall, The Ranch, and Tease. The lesbian-owned restaurant El Arrayan closed in 2020, during the COVID-19 pandemic. When the upscale dance bar Therapy closed in the 2020s, Studs was expanded to two floors. The cantina-style Los Amigos closed in 2025.

=== Bathhouses and strip clubs ===
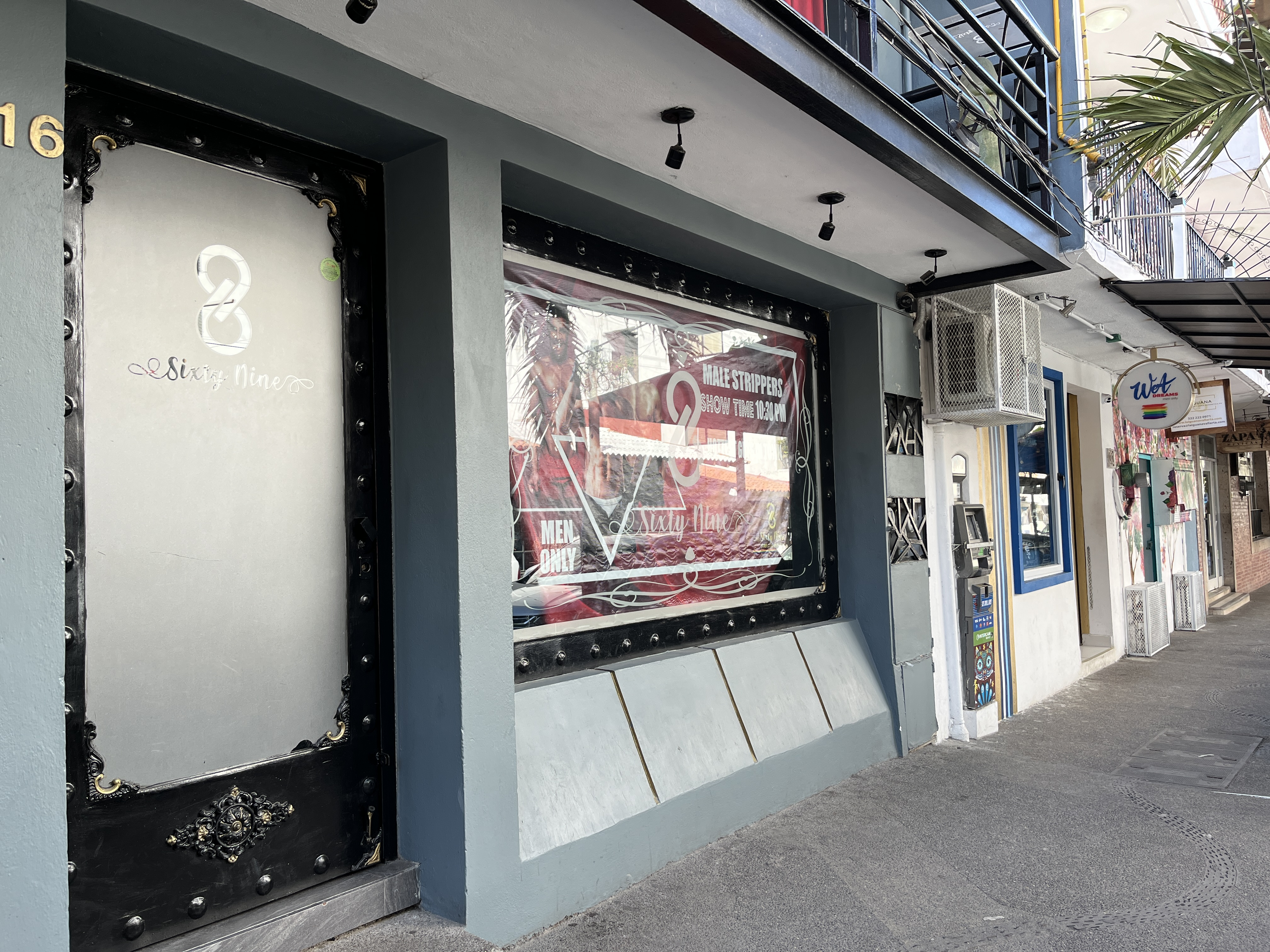
The strip clubs Sixty Nine and Wet Dreams in Zona Romántica in 2023

Spartacus is a gay bathhouse. According to GAYPV, Puerto Vallarta is home to "some of Mexico's most popular" gay strip clubs. The city has three gay-friendly male strip clubs, as of 2020: Antropology, Sixty Nine, and Wet Dreams. The largest is Antropology, which was established in 2000 and features a go-go shower. According to Out, Sixty Nine "offers a more upscale experience, with expert pole dancers performing amazing feats for the crowd", and Wet Dreams "is probably the most well-known, although it looks seedy and the men can be aggressive here in pulling customers into back rooms". Established in 2018, Wet Dreams (or simply Wet) was the first-such venue to host a go-go shower show. The two-level venue "sports the traditional American style strip down shows", according to GAYPV, which has also said, "The owner of Wet Dreams owns other bars in town so you will see the hot strippers in circuit parties" at Industry and Mantamar.

=== Health care ===
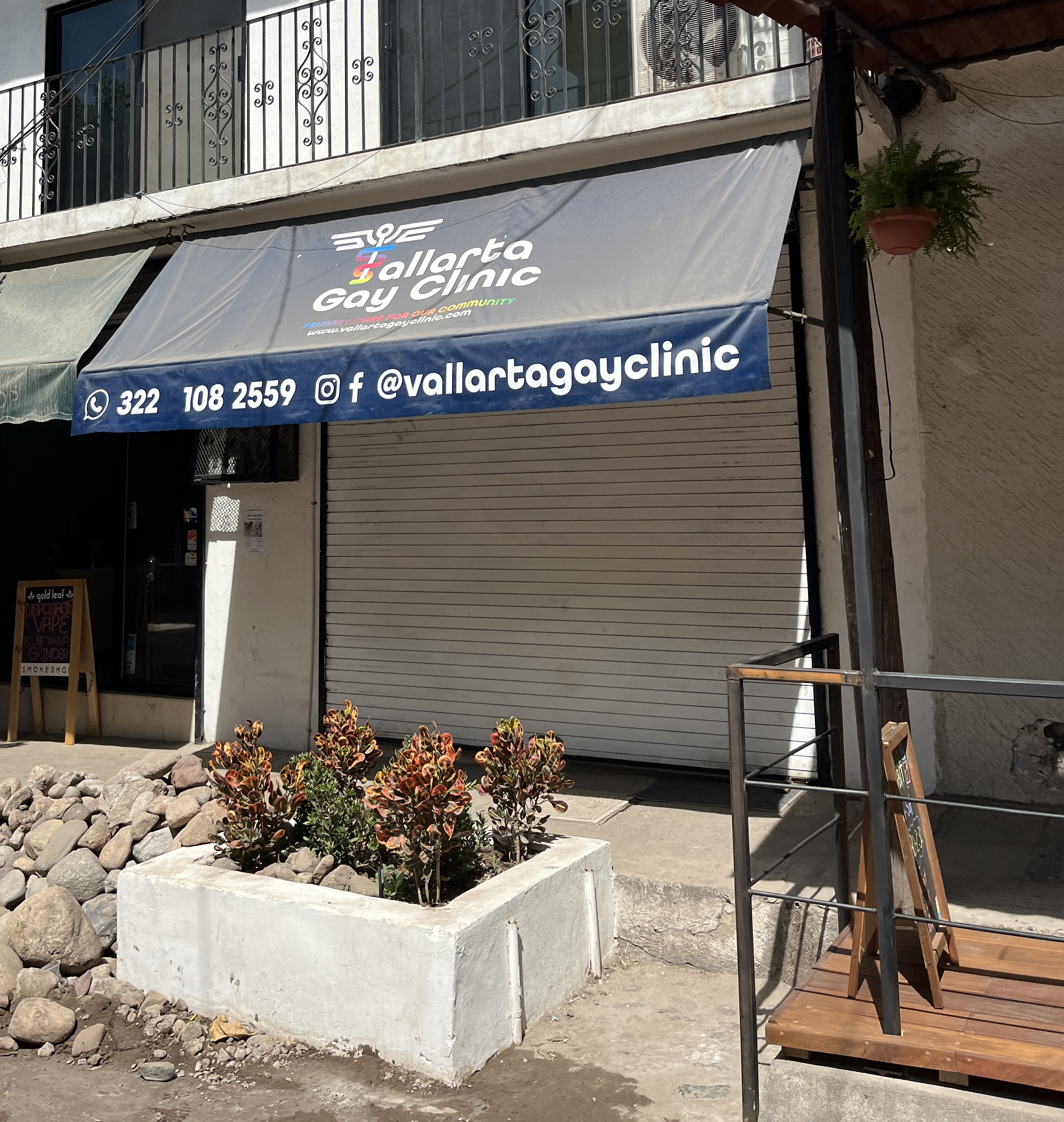
Vallarta Gay Clinic, 2023

In 2023, a private clinic specializing in LGBTQ healthcare called Vallarta Gay Clinic opened in Zona Romántica. Additionally, the "gay-owned and operated telehealth platform" MISTR announced plans to open its first international location in Zona Romántica in April that year. According to Bear World Magazine, MISTR will offer an "in-person presence ... where Mexican nationals, permanent residents and non-residents of Mexico and Latin America can receive free access" to pre-exposure prophylaxis (PrEP).

Solidaridad Ed Thomas AC (SETAC) is a local organization and community center focused on LGBTQ healthcare. According to Bear World, SETAC is "dedicated to educating and distributing information about HIV and other sexually transmitted infections". The nonprofit has operated two locations in Puerto Vallarta, including one in Zona Romántica. SETAC launched a program for PrEP in 2018. An initial agreement for a three-year program sought to provide treatment to 300 individuals at no cost, in collaboration with CENSIDA, Mexico City's Condensa Specialized Clinic, the National Institute of Public Health, and the United Nations Population Fund. In 2022, SETAC illuminated Los Arcos and the Municipal Palace with red lights to commemorate World AIDS Day. Both locations halted operations in February 2023 due to a lack of government funding.

=== Hotels and resorts ===
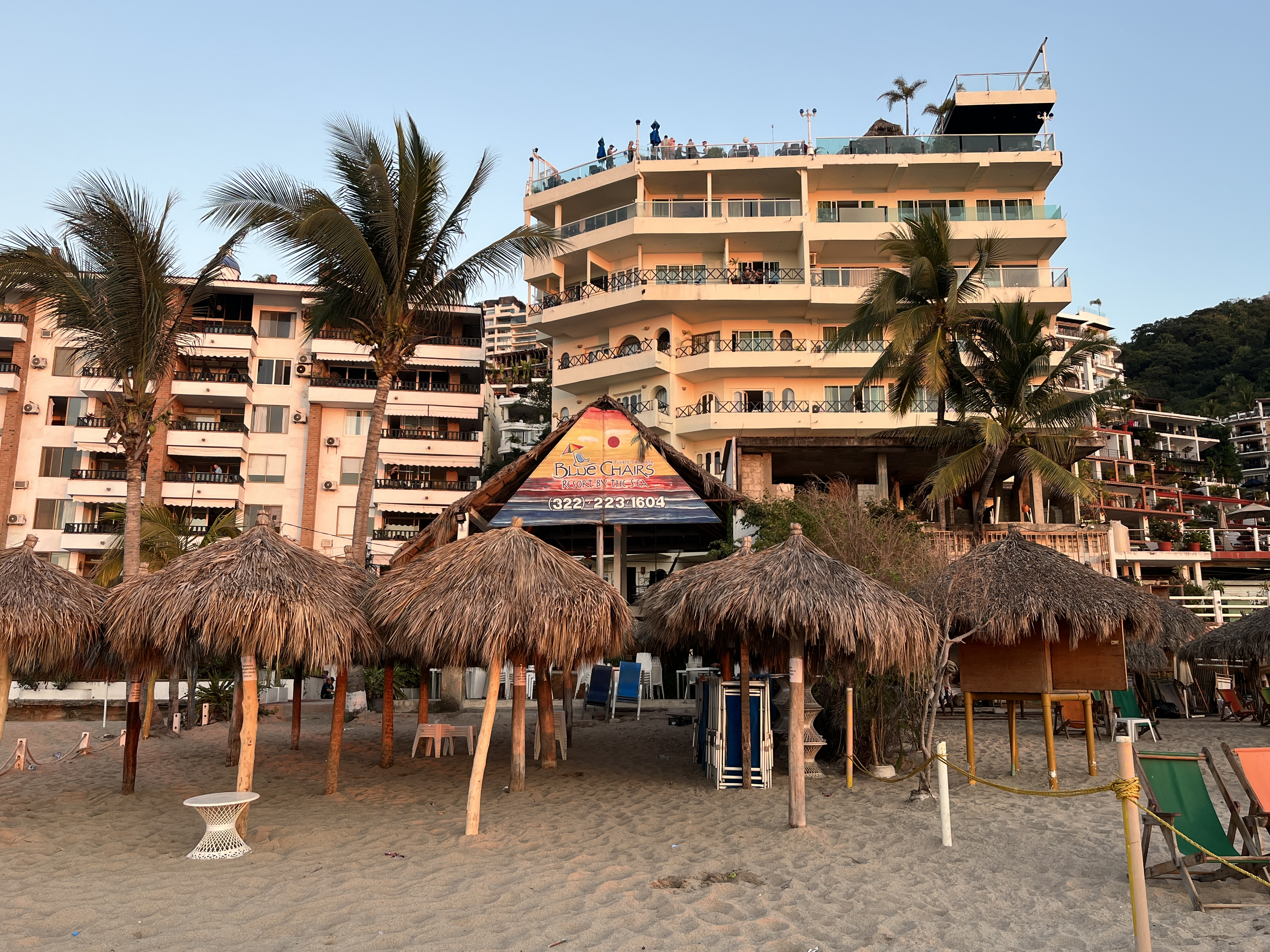
Blue Chairs Resort by the Sea, 2023

Puerto Vallarta offers many LGBTQ-friendly accommodations, including from bed and breakfasts, guesthouses, hotels, lodges, and resorts. According to Keith Langstone of Lonely Planet, "All the big brand resorts are LGBTIQ-inclusive, and there are even LGBTIQ-exclusive hotels". In addition to Almar Resort and Blue Chairs Resort by the Sea, LGBTQ hotels and resorts have included The Abbey Hotel, Amaca, Casa Cupula, the three-story Hotel Mercurio, Pinata PV, and the male-only, clothing-optional Villa David. In 2007, the Bay Area Reporter said: "The Vallarta Cora is the oldest gay hotel in Puerto Vallarta and attracts a very loyal crowd even during the slower summer months. It is all male and is also the only gay clothing optional hotel in the city."

Almar Resort, which is affiliated with Mantamar and Top Sky Bar, was described as Puerto Vallarta's "only luxury LGBT+ resort" in Lonely Planet Mexico (2022). Ross Mathews got married at the hotel in 2022. Casa Cupula hosts Naked Pool Party weekly. Hotel Mercurio hosts a beer bust featuring drag-and-strip shows called Beer, Boys, and Burgers. Lonely Planet describes Villa David as a clothing-optional "gay retreat". Marriott Puerto Vallarta Resort & Spa has been described as a gay-and lesbian-friendly hotel. The 55-room gay resort Tryst opened in Zona Romántica in 2024.

Defunct properties include Paco's Paradise, described as a private gay beach and hotel.

=== Performance venues ===
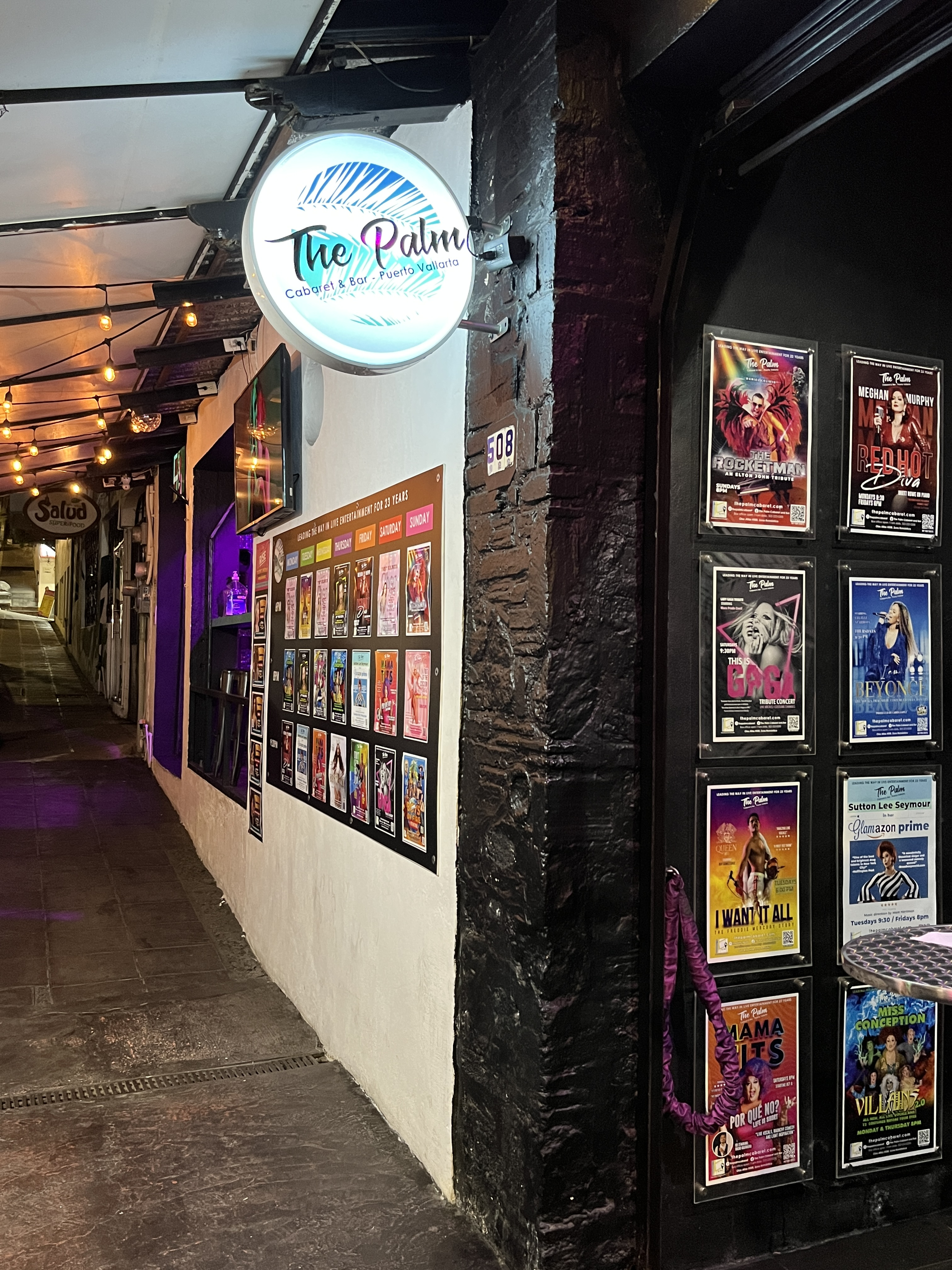
Palm Cabaret and Bar, 2023

Performance venues in Puerto Vallarta include Palm Cabaret and Bar and Act II (also known as Act2PV), both of which have hosted drag shows by Mama Tits and other drag queens. Frommer's said Palm's "crowd is mostly gay, but straights won't feel out of place if they come (the management and patrons are a tolerant bunch)". The venue has hosted Dame Edna Everage and tribute shows to gay icons and LGBTQ artists such as Lady Gaga and Freddie Mercury. Palm presented the drag shows Miss Conception's TV Land in 2019, Booby Tunes in 2020, and Dueling Drag Divas during 2020–2021.

In addition to drag shows, Act II has hosted a production of The Rocky Horror Picture Show and a program dedicated to Whitney Houston. Act II's Red Room has hosted drag shows by Hedda Lettuce, as well as The Very Breast of JoAnna, as of 2019. The Red Room hosted the show Miscast Men of Broadway by The Boy Band Project, which has been described as an all-gay cover band, as of 2020.

=== Publications ===
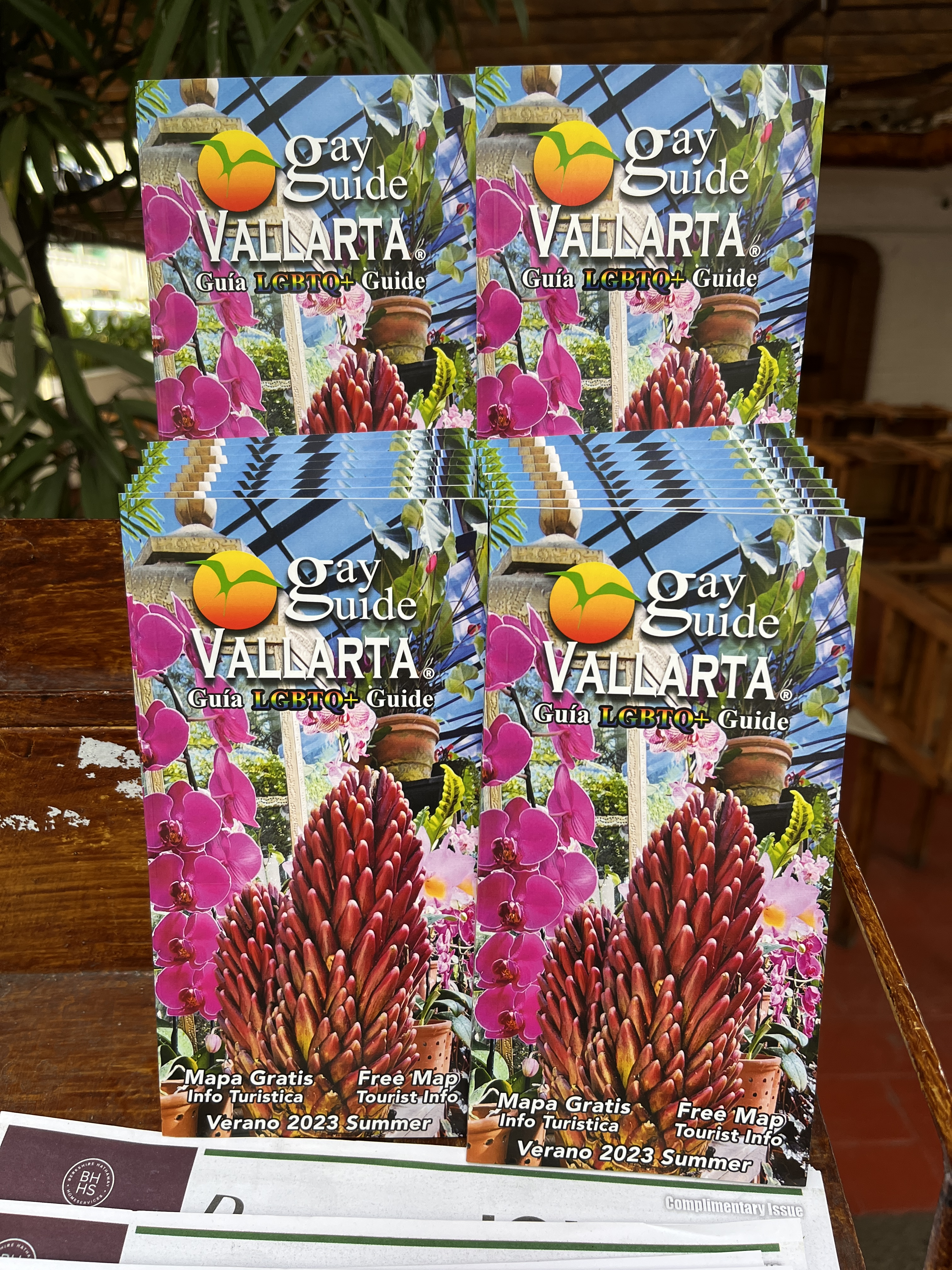
Gay Guide Vallarta, 2023

LGBTQ publications in Puerto Vallarta include Gay Guide Vallarta, GAYPV, and Urbana Revista. Gay Guide Vallarta is written primarily in English and includes a map. GAYPV is available in both English and Spanish. GAYPV partners with the PV Convention and Visitors Bureau. The glossy magazine Urbana Revista offers online event listings and also focuses on Guadalajara.

== Events ==
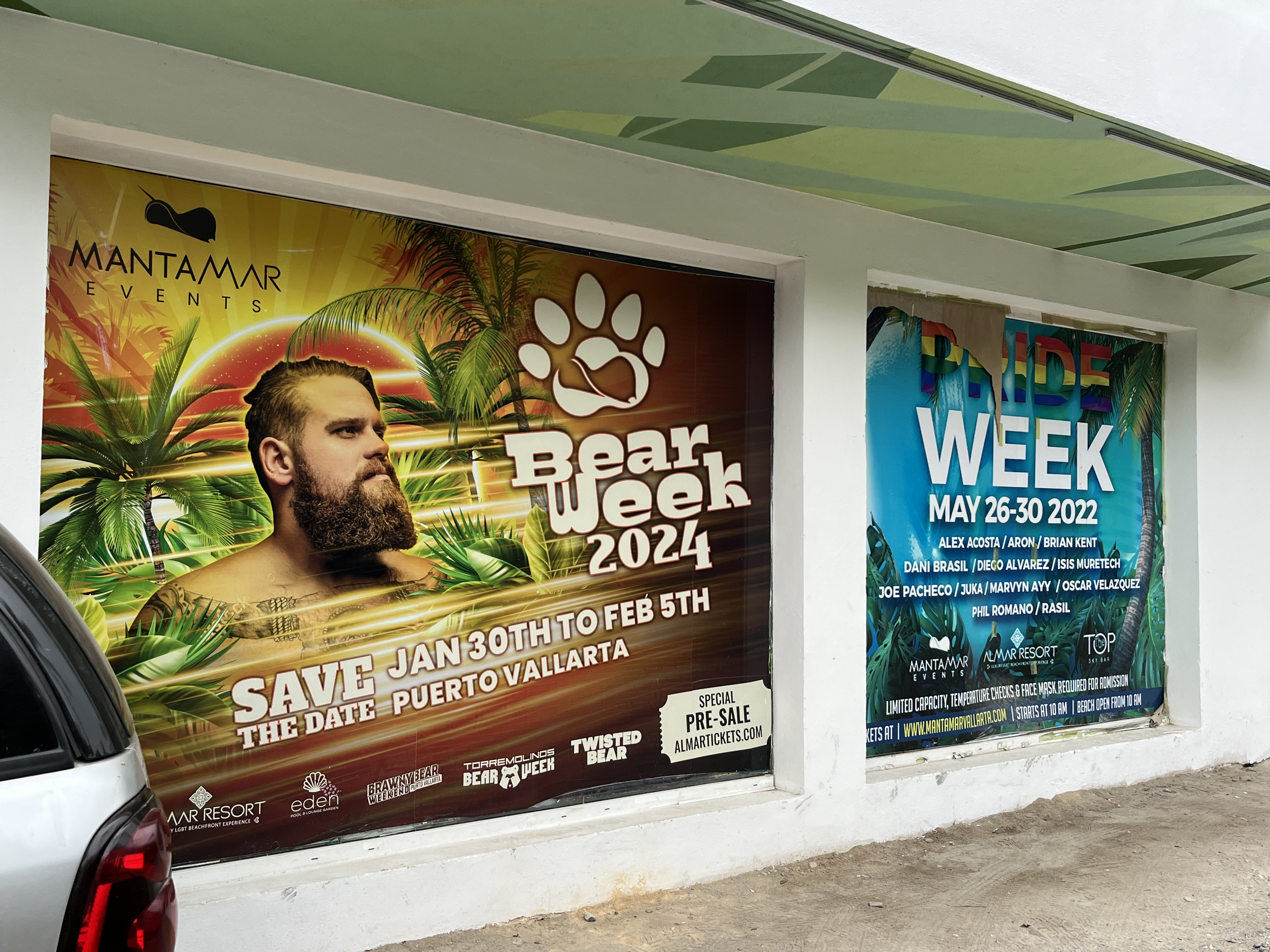
Signs for Bear Week and Pride Week on the exterior of Almar Resort, 2024

For thirty years, Puerto Vallarta has hosted events as part of World AIDS Day, as of 2022. Activities have included a walk, conferences, and workshops seeking to increase awareness of HIV/AIDS prevention.

White Party events are held on weekends around holidays such as Thanksgiving, New Year's Eve, and Presidents' Day, which is celebrated in the United States in February. Mantamar hosted an annual White Party Sunset Pool event each November, as of 2019. In 2021, some members of the LGBTQ community criticized a White Party that was held on New Year's Eve during the COVID-19 pandemic for disregarding health regulations.

Puerto Vallarta was a tourist venue when Guadalajara co-hosted the Gay Games in 2023.

=== Vallarta Pride ===
Puerto Vallarta hosts an annual Pride celebration in mid-to-late May. According to The Advocate, "Vallarta Pride works toward a future without discrimination where all have equal rights under fair and equal law. They achieve this through the LGBTQ events that inspire, commemorate, and celebrate the community." In 2014, SFGATE said the event had "expanded from a three-day weekend to five days of beach parties, music festivals, fashion shows, assorted activities and a mass commitment ceremony".

During the celebration activities take place throughout the city, including beaches. In 2017, approximately 17,000 people attended Vallarta Pride. The pride parade had 60 floats and attracted an estimated 7,000 spectators. Other activities included an exclusive Women's Rooftop Party, a Glowjob Party at Casa Cupula, a Carnivale-inspired White Party at Mantamar, screenings of LGBTQ films, and a health fair at Plaza Hidalgo. Nelson Branco of Toronto Sun said of his 2017 experience: "The city not only allowed cops to walk in the parade—but for the first time, the entire police, medical and fire forces proudly sashayed down the boardwalk, including Mayor [Arturo Dávalos Peña]".

In 2018, Vallarta Pride included arts and culture events spanning seven days. The 2019 event featured a swimsuit fashion show. National Geographic said in 2019, "The parade brings nearly all residents out to see the marchers and colorful floats pass along the picturesque Malecón and ends with a festive block party. Its over-the-top Drag Derby, a combination drag pageant and obstacle course race, is not to be missed." Lola Mendez ranked Puerto Vallarta number one in The Times' list of "best places around the world to celebrate Pride in 2023".

=== Beef Dip Bear Week ===
The annual event Beef Dip Bear Week caters to the bear community. Bear World Magazine described it as "one of the foremost bear events in the world". According to Quadratín Jalisco, Beef Dip Bear Week is the world's longest bear event. The 2020 event included a foam-pool party and karaoke, and the nineteenth event in 2023 spanned eight days. Beef Dip Bear Week benefits social causes; proceeds in 2023 benefited SETAC and a local food bank.

== Safety ==
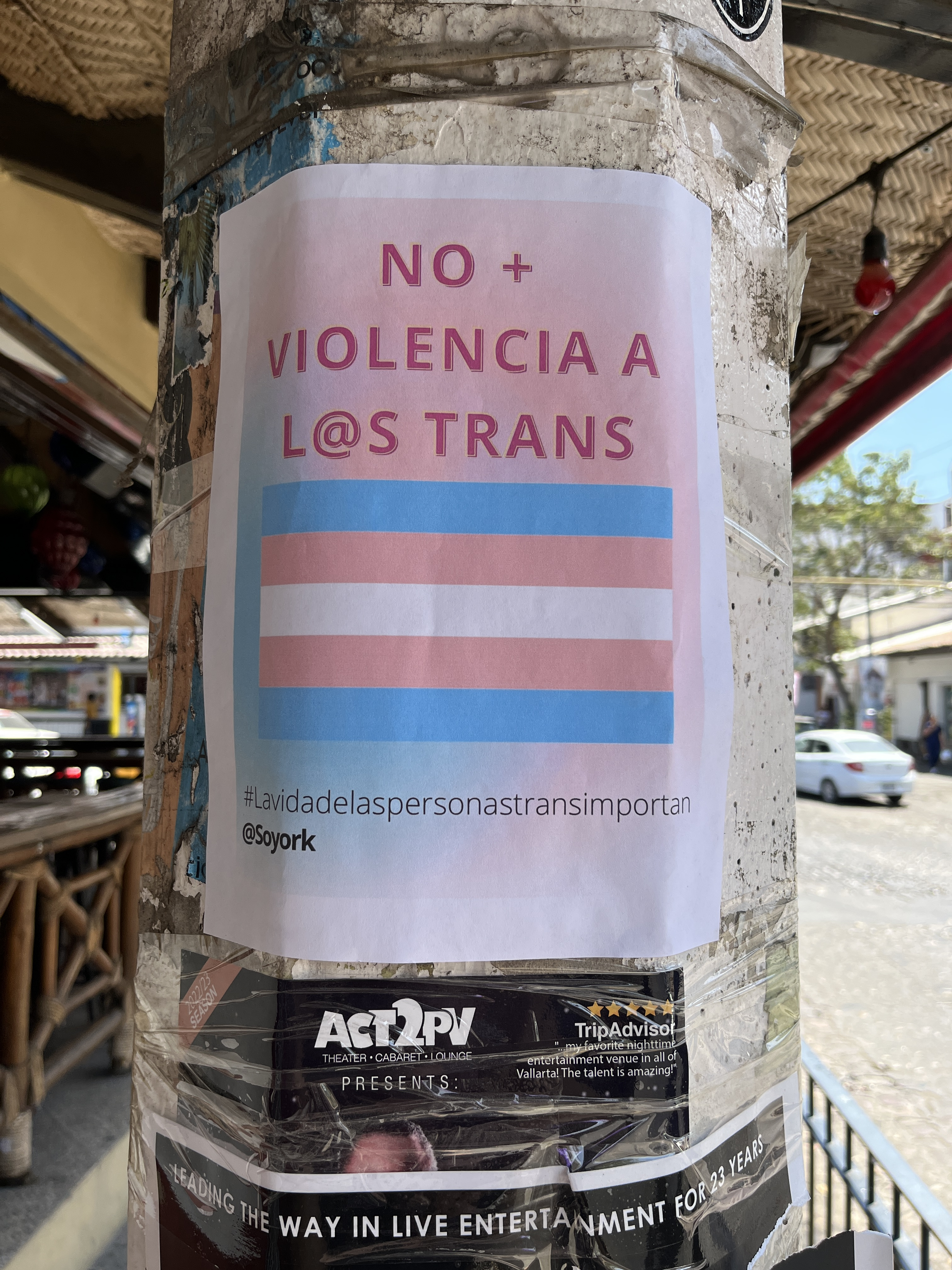
Sign in Zona Romántica condemning violence against transgender people, 2023

Puerto Vallarta has been recognized as one of the safest travel destinations for the LGBTQ community. Despite this, instances of violence against LGBTQ people have occurred in the city.

In 2018, a gunman attacked a gay couple who were holding hands near Lázaro Cárdenas Park, injuring one person. One of the victims "alleged that the incident was motivated by the couple's sexuality" and "expressed concern that police were covering up what really happened in order to avoid damaging the tourism sector". The LGBT Business and Tourism Association of Puerto Vallarta and the Puerto Vallarta Tourism Board issued a joint statement condemning the attack, expressing sympathies for the couple, and saying visitors "are part of the LGBTQ community and safely enjoy the destination, again without any incident".

According to Vallarta Daily News, in 2018, local police were collaborating with the LGBTTTI Vallarta Collective on sensitivity training. In 2022, the city's police commissioner announced the creation of Mexico's first Gay Police Unit. In 2023, the U.S. Department of State discouraged citizens from traveling to Jalisco "over increased crime and kidnappings in the region".

== Art ==
In 2022, Puerto Vallarta's building commission announced plans to paint rainbow crossings at intersections in the neighborhoods Amapas and Zona Romántica. As of 2023, artist Octavio González is working on Puerto Vallarta's first sculpture to be dedicated to the LGBTQ community.

== See also ==
- LGBTQ culture in Tijuana
- Same-sex marriage in Jalisco
