= Puerto Vallarta Pride =

LGBT event in Puerto Vallarta, Mexico

- Genre: Pride event
- Frequency: Annual
- Locations: Puerto Vallarta, Jalisco, Mexico
- Years active: 2013-present
- Most recent: 20-26 May 2024

Puerto Vallarta Pride is an annual LGBTQ pride event held in Puerto Vallarta, Jalisco, Mexico. Although the city has been a travel destination for members of the LGBTQ community since the 20th century, the official Puerto Vallarta Pride event was first held in 2013, lasting three days. The event is usually held in May, both due to weather conditions and because fewer tourists tend to visit the city during that month. In 2014, the event was lengthened from three days to five. The event was cancelled in 2020 due to the COVID-19 pandemic, but returned in May 2021. As of 2023, Puerto Vallarta holds both a Pride Week and a Lesbian Week.

A pride parade has been held as part of the event since its inception in 2013. In 2017, the parade attracted between 17,000 and 24,000 attendees. Other events include art exhibitions, block parties, drag derbies, fashion shows, film screenings, and musical performances. In 2014, a "mass commitment ceremony" was held, following Jalisco's passing of a civil union law earlier in the year. The 2014 edition also saw a women-organized party aimed towards LGBTQ women.

== See also ==
- LGBTQ culture in Puerto Vallarta
