= Los Amigos (Puerto Vallarta) =

Defunct gay bar in Puerto Vallarta, Jalisco, Mexico

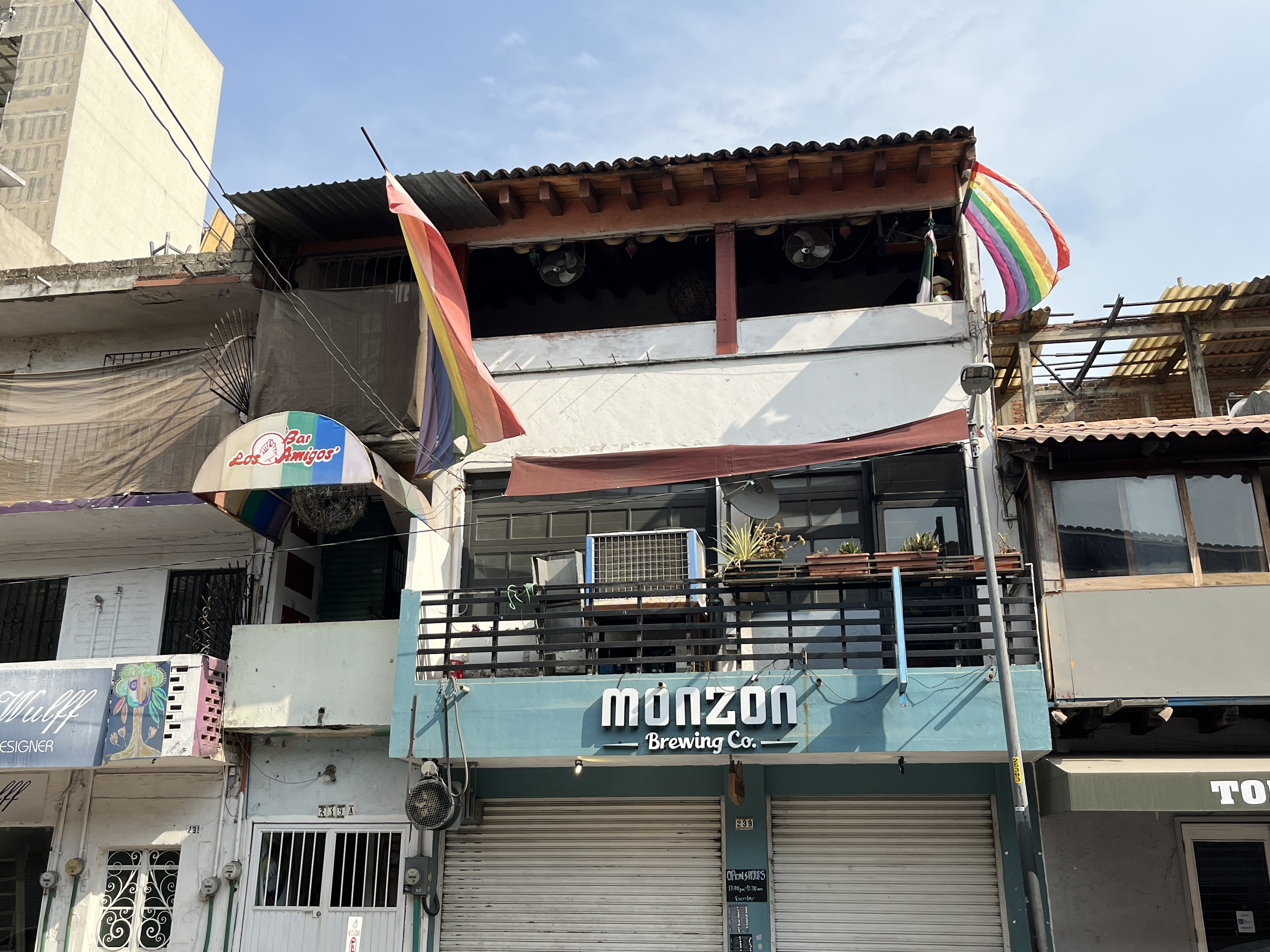
- The bar's exterior in 2023
- Interactive map of Los Amigos

Restaurant information
- Established: October 1998
- Closed: 2025
- Location: Puerto Vallarta, Jalisco, Mexico
- Coordinates: 20.6029°N 105.2364°W

Los Amigos was a gay bar in Puerto Vallarta, Jalisco, Mexico. Established in 1998, it operated in the Zona Romántica neighborhood before closing permanently in 2025.

== Description ==
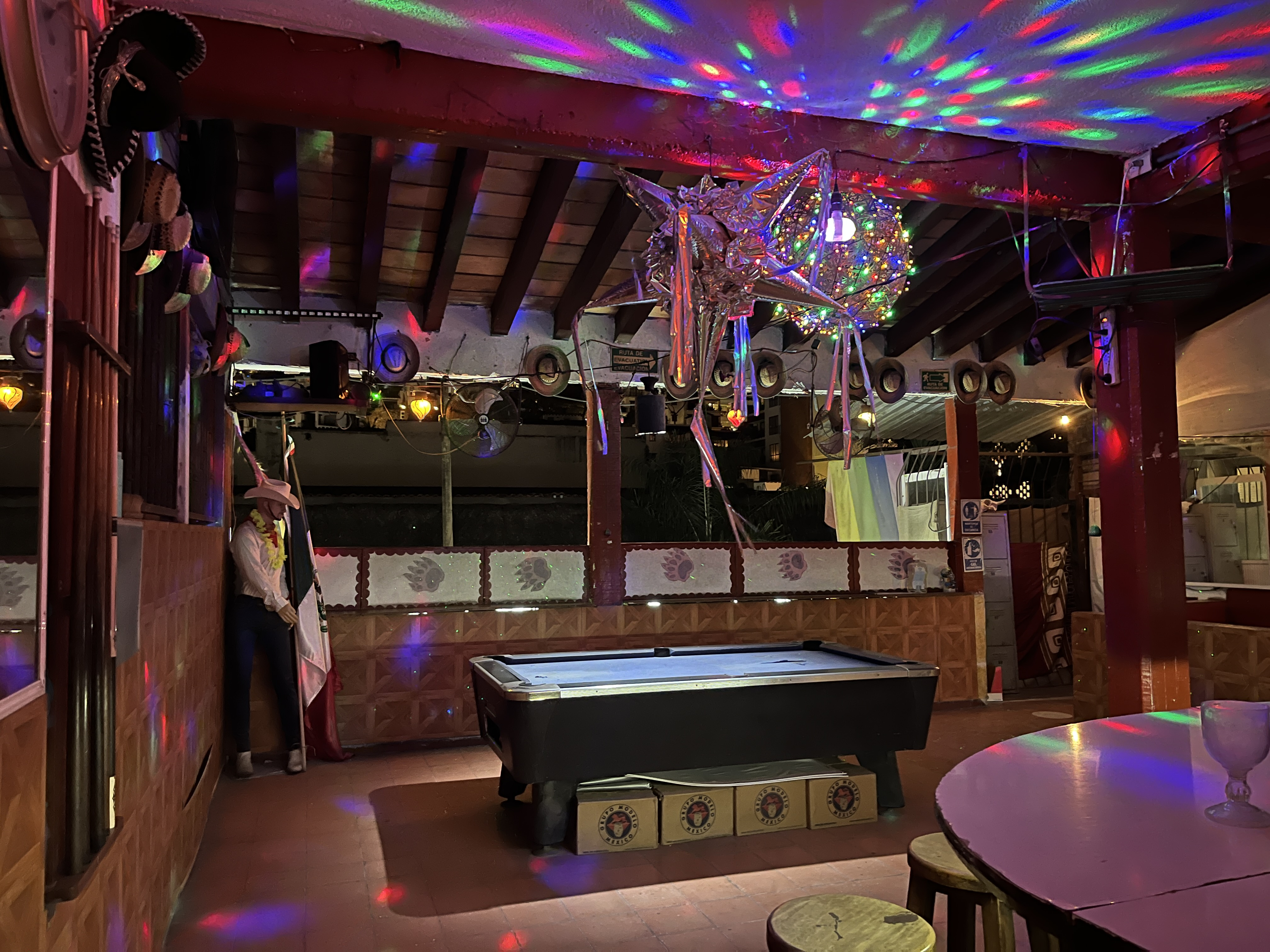
The bar's interior (2023)

The gay bar Los Amigos operated on Venustiano Carranza in Puerto Vallarta's Zona Romántica neighborhood. Guide books by Moon Publications described the bar as a "laid-back neighborhood hangout" with friendly service and patrons "who are not necessarily on the prowl or trying to be chic". Banderas News called Los Amigos a "basic, friendly cantina-style bar". Xtra Magazine said the bar catered to bears and cowboys, and featured a terrace and inexpensive drinks.

Out and About PV described the bar as an "iconic, eclectic, old style cantina" that catered to cowboys, hosted meetings and parties, and played mostly regional Mexican music but also some English-language songs. In 2022, the website's Salvador Dominguez wrote: "It has an excellent atmosphere, they take care of you wonderfully and make you feel very comfortable throughout your stay. Los Amigos is a warm place, you feel welcome from the moment you arrive. The prices are accessible, its bar is varied and the place is quite spacious."

== History ==
Arturo Orozco Lopez opened Los Amigos in October 1998, in the space that previously housed Centro Botanero. Los Amigos was one of only four gay bars in the city at the time; the others were Los Balcones, Paco Paco, and Why Not?

The bar closed in 2025. It was the city's oldest gay bar at the time. Los Amigos was replaced by the gay bar Sanctuary Puerto Vallarta (or Sanctuary PV). Reporting on the closure of Los Amigos, Out and About PV called the business "the only gay bar ... in Puerto Vallarta with the same owner, at the same location, and with the same great ambiance since the very first day".

== Reception ==
Out and About PV recommended the bar for "a truly local place without much noise" and "a quiet option for you to go with your companions to talk and have a good time". A writer for the Dallas Voice also considered Los Amigos a "friendly" bar.

== See also ==
- LGBTQ culture in Puerto Vallarta
- List of LGBTQ bars
