= Bar Frida =

Gay bar in Puerto Vallarta, Jalisco, Mexico

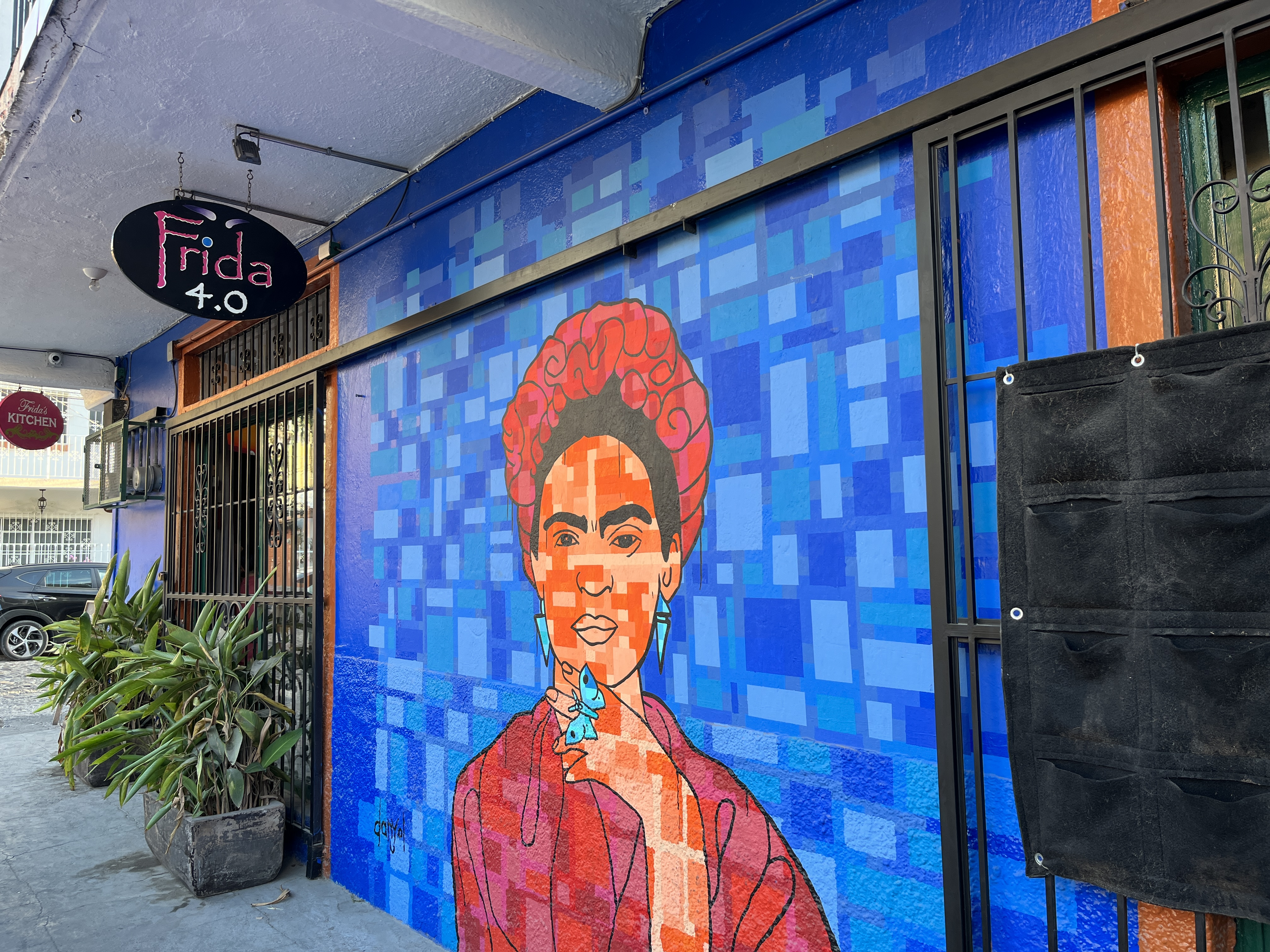
- The bar's exterior, 2023
- Interactive map of Bar Frida

Restaurant information
- Owner: Tom Finley
- Location: Francisco I. Madero 418, Puerto Vallarta, Jalisco, Mexico
- Coordinates: 20.604684°N 105.232624°W

Bar Frida Cantina Puerto Vallarta, or simply Bar Frida, is a gay bar in Puerto Vallarta's Zona Romántica, in the Mexican state of Jalisco.

== Description ==
The gay bar operated at multiple locations in Zona Romántica, using a series of nicknames for differentiation. According to GAYPV, Bar Frida is among Puerto Vallarta's oldest Mexican gay cantinas, with local owners and a "very local" clientele. The bar has a jukebox with English and Spanish music. The food menu has included appetizers, burgers and sandwiches, fajitas, and salads.

According to Out and About Puerto Vallarta, "Bar Frida 4.0 and Frida's Kitchen are actually two separate businesses operated in the same space... [You] will receive two separate bills if you drink from the bar and eat from the restaurant – one from Bar Frida's and one from Frida's Kitchen."

== History ==
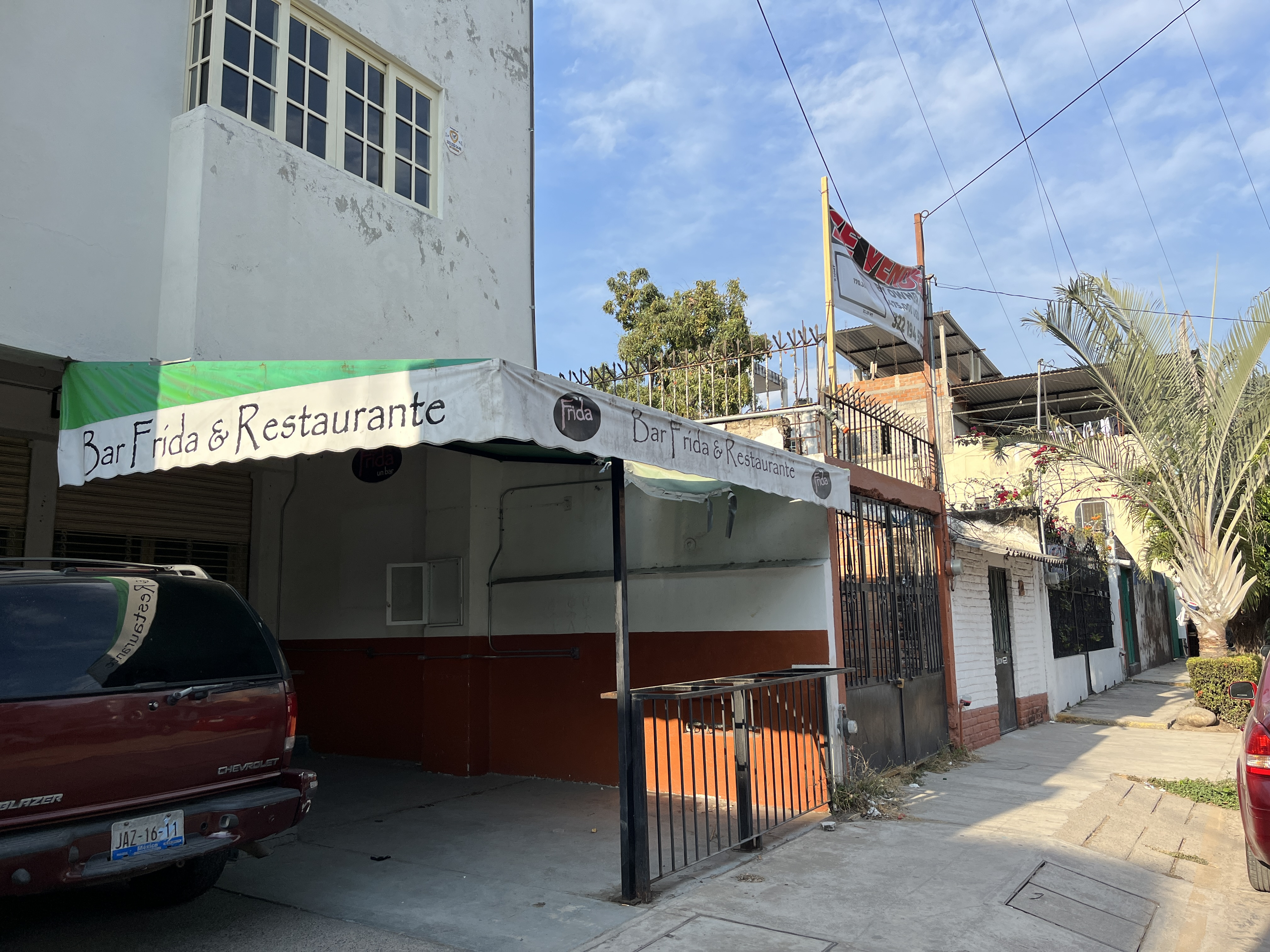
Exterior of a former location in 2023

The original bar opened at Lazaro Cardenas #361 in 2001, in the space currently occupied by Reinas Bar. The business operated at Avenue Insurgentes #301 as Bar Frida 2.0 from 2009 until September 2020. Bar Frida 3.0 began operating at Lázaro Cárdenas #481 in October 2020, and Bar Frida 4.0 and Frida's Kitchen operated at Naranjo and Venustiano Carranza streets starting October 2022. Bar Frida has operated at its fifth and current location at Francisco I. Madero 418 since August 1, 2025.

The bar was owned and operated by partners Tom Finley and Luis Mendez, until Mendez's death in August 2022. Finley originally acquired the business license for a bar called Frida's which had been operating on Lázaro Cárdenas, and kept the name. Alberto Cueva is the chef. Frida's Kitchen has served holiday meals for Thanksgiving, Christmas, and New Year's Eve.

== Reception ==
In 2019, Ed Walsh of the Bay Area Reporter called Bar Frida "an LGBT Puerto Vallarta institution". He said the "fabulous" bar "serves up comfort food at bargain prices" and wrote, "It's a great place to mix it up with locals, with some of the best drinks in town."

== See also ==
- List of LGBTQ bars
