= La Noche (Puerto Vallarta) =

Gay bar in Puerto Vallarta, Jalisco, Mexico

- Logo

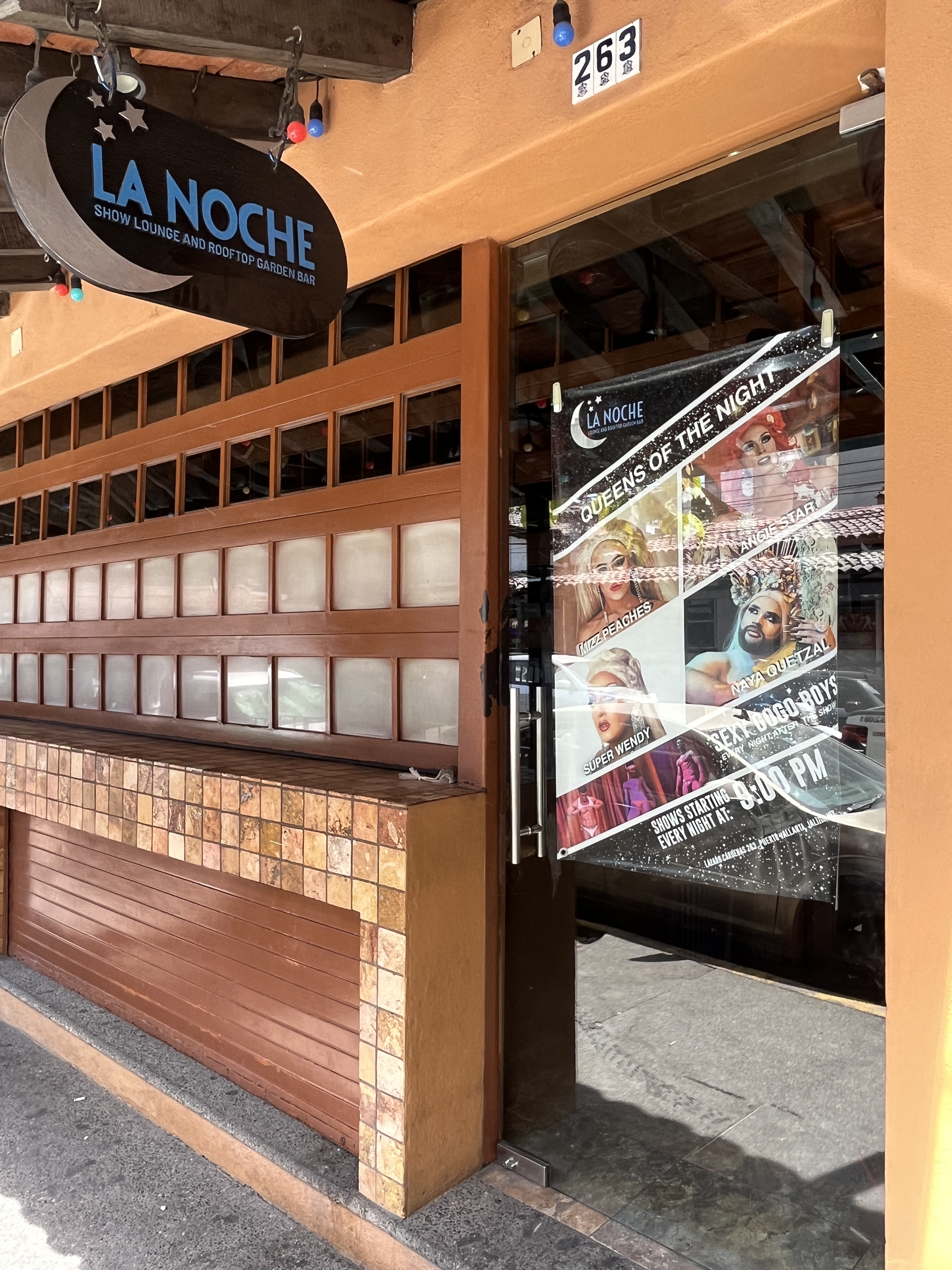
- The bar's entrance, 2023
- Interactive map of La Noche
- Address: Puerto Vallarta, Jalisco; Mexico
- Coordinates: 20.6036°N 105.2357°W

Website
- lanochepv.com

La Noche is a gay bar in Puerto Vallarta's Zona Romántica, in the Mexican state of Jalisco. The bar has donated to SETAC, an LGBT center in Puerto Vallarta. Drag queen Super Wendy performed at the bar nightly, as of 2017.

== Description ==
The bar hosts drag shows and has a rooftop, which Out's Daniel Reynolds said was the "easiest place on the block to grab fresh air and mingle with other patrons". Amy Ashenden of PinkNews said: "La Noche also has regular drag shows and male dancers on podiums – although it isn't exclusively for men like Wet Dreams is." Iñigo Alkorta of Vallarta Lifestyles said, "La Noche, a lounge and rooftop bar with two atmospheres, either for dancing or chatting on its intimate terrace." In 2021, Hornet's Jorge Gallegos wrote: "La Noche Bar is the ultimate gay lounge: nice cocktails, entertaining drag shows, hot go-go boys, several levels and a beautiful rooftop garden. Make it your first stop after dinner." Ed Walsh of the Bay Area Reporter says the bar is "busier earlier in the evening".

== See also ==
- List of LGBTQ bars
