= Garbo (Puerto Vallarta) =

Gay-friendly bar in Puerto Vallarta, Jalisco, Mexico

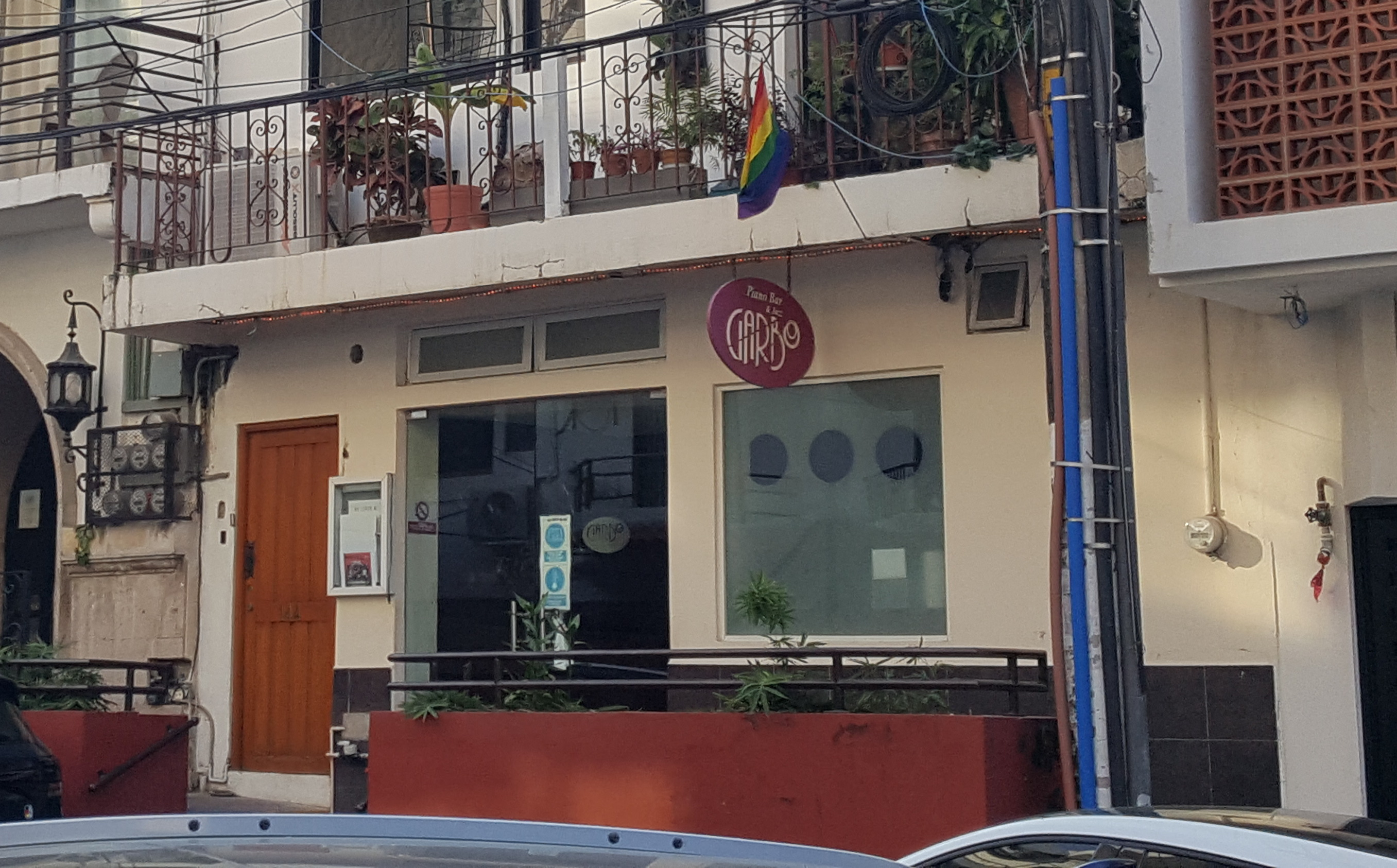
- The bar's exterior in 2021
- Interactive map of Garbo

Restaurant information
- Location: Puerto Vallarta, Jalisco, Mexico
- Coordinates: 20.5996°N 105.2376°W

Garbo (sometimes Piano Bar & Jazz Garbo) is a gay-friendly bar in Zona Romántica, Puerto Vallarta, in the Mexican state of Jalisco.

== Description ==
Garbo has been described as a martini bar with live music and dim lighting. According to Fodor's, "This isn't necessarily the kind of place where you'll strike up a conversation with the guy on the next barstool; rather, it's an upscale place to go with friends for a sophisticated, air-conditioned drink or two. A musician plays piano or gentle jazz on weekend nights at 10:30 during high season, less often the rest of the year. Garbo, renowned for its martinis, is primarily a gay club, but is straight friendly and is open nightly from 6 pm to 2 am."

Lonely Planet says, "If you enjoy jazzy stylings and like your martinis dirty or extra tart, make your way to this concrete-floor habitat. The jazz and torch singing kicks off nightly at 10:30pm and is decent to good, and there's a small dance floor to shake your moneymaker."

Justin Henderson's Moon guide for Puerto Vallarta says, "Garbo is one of the most popular and fun bars in Puerto Vallarta. Located in the trendy Olas Altas area, Garbo caters to a mixed crowd of straight and gay men and women. You can sit at the bar and chat with the lively bartender and your neighbors, or find a quiet table in the corner and enjoy the nightly piano music. You'll find the clientele and staff very friendly and the drink list exquisite."

== Reception ==
In 2018, Stephen Woodman included the bar in The Culture Trip's list of "The 10 Best Bars in Puerto Vallarta, Mexico", writing: "Never too far from the top of any local’s recommendation list, Piano Bar & Jazz Garbo is a gay-friendly venue with excellent live music acts that play from 10 p.m. With stylish décor and even more stylishly-dressed regulars, the bar has a sophisticated vibe and is one of the best places to enjoy live music while sipping a well-made martini."
