= La Catrina Cantina =

Bar and entertainment venue in Puerto Vallarta, Jalisco, Mexico

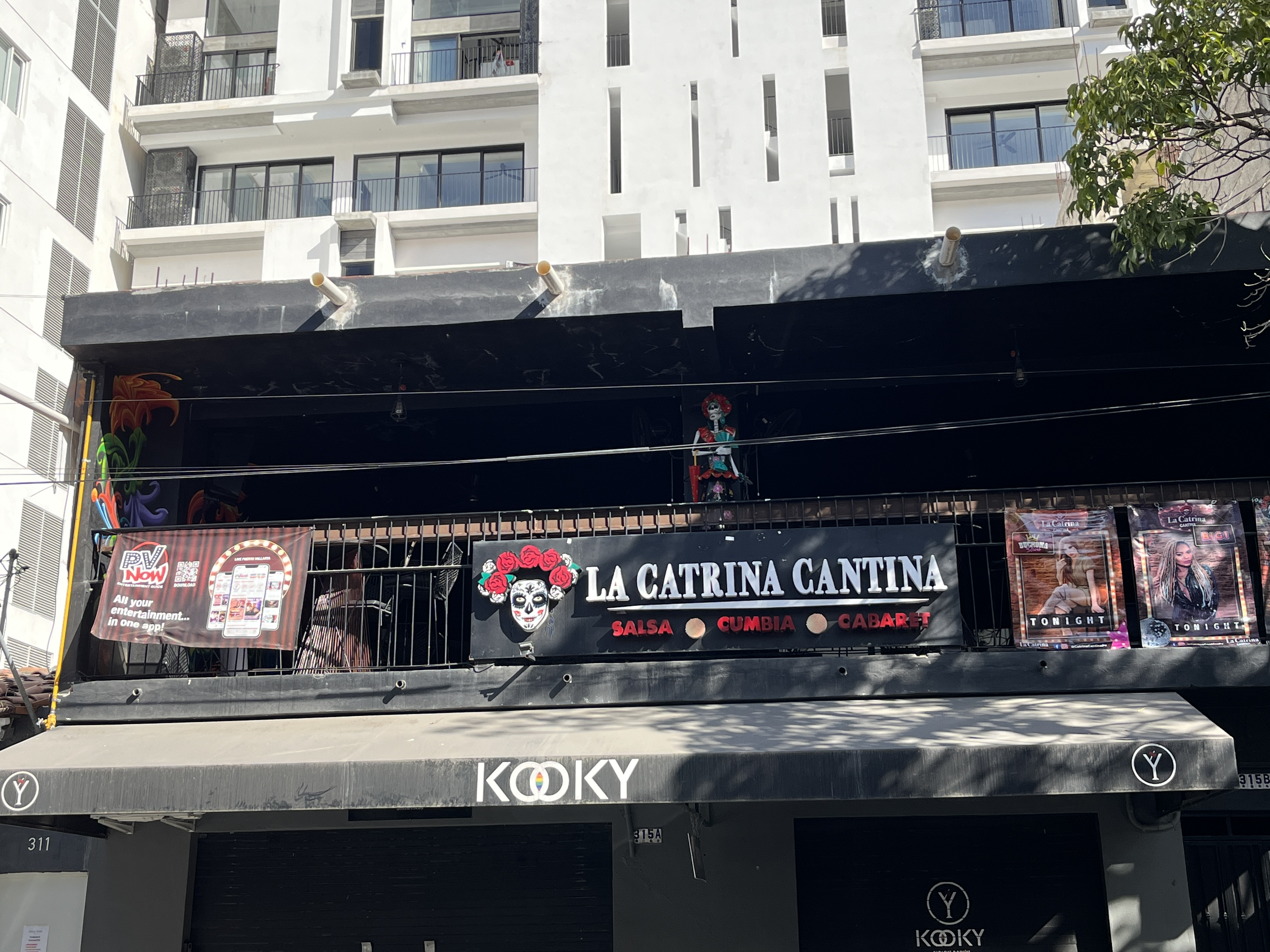
- The venue's exterior, 2023
- Interactive map of La Catrina Cantina

Restaurant information
- Established: May 2020
- Owner: Juan Alvarado
- Location: Lázaro Cárdenas 315, Puerto Vallarta, Jalisco, Mexico
- Coordinates: 20.60385°N 105.2347°W

La Catrina Cantina is an LGBT-friendly bar and entertainment venue in Zona Romántica, Puerto Vallarta, in the Mexican state of Jalisco. Juan Alvarado opened the venue in May 2020.

== Description ==
La Catrina Cantina is an LGBT-friendly bar and entertainment venue on Lázaro Cárdenas in Puerto Vallarta's Zona Romántica, housed in a building's second floor above Kooky Karaoke. Out and About Puerto Vallarta describes the business as a "Mexican cabaret showcasing local artists and Spanish music including singers, dancers, and drag queens. Music genres range from mariachi, ranchera, cumbia, salsa, to Mexican folk music." The venue has also hosted comedians and karaoke. For Halloween, La Catrina Cantina has held costume contests for both people and dogs, as well as a Moulin Rouge-themed party.

== History ==
Juan Alvarado established La Catrina Cantina in May 2020, during the COVID-19 pandemic. The bar hosts approximately 20 artists who perform regularly, as of February 2023. The venue has also hosted a member of the American music group The Platters, according to David Landis of the San Francisco Bay Times.
