= Paco's Ranch =

Gay bar in Puerto Vallarta, Jalisco, Mexico

- Logo

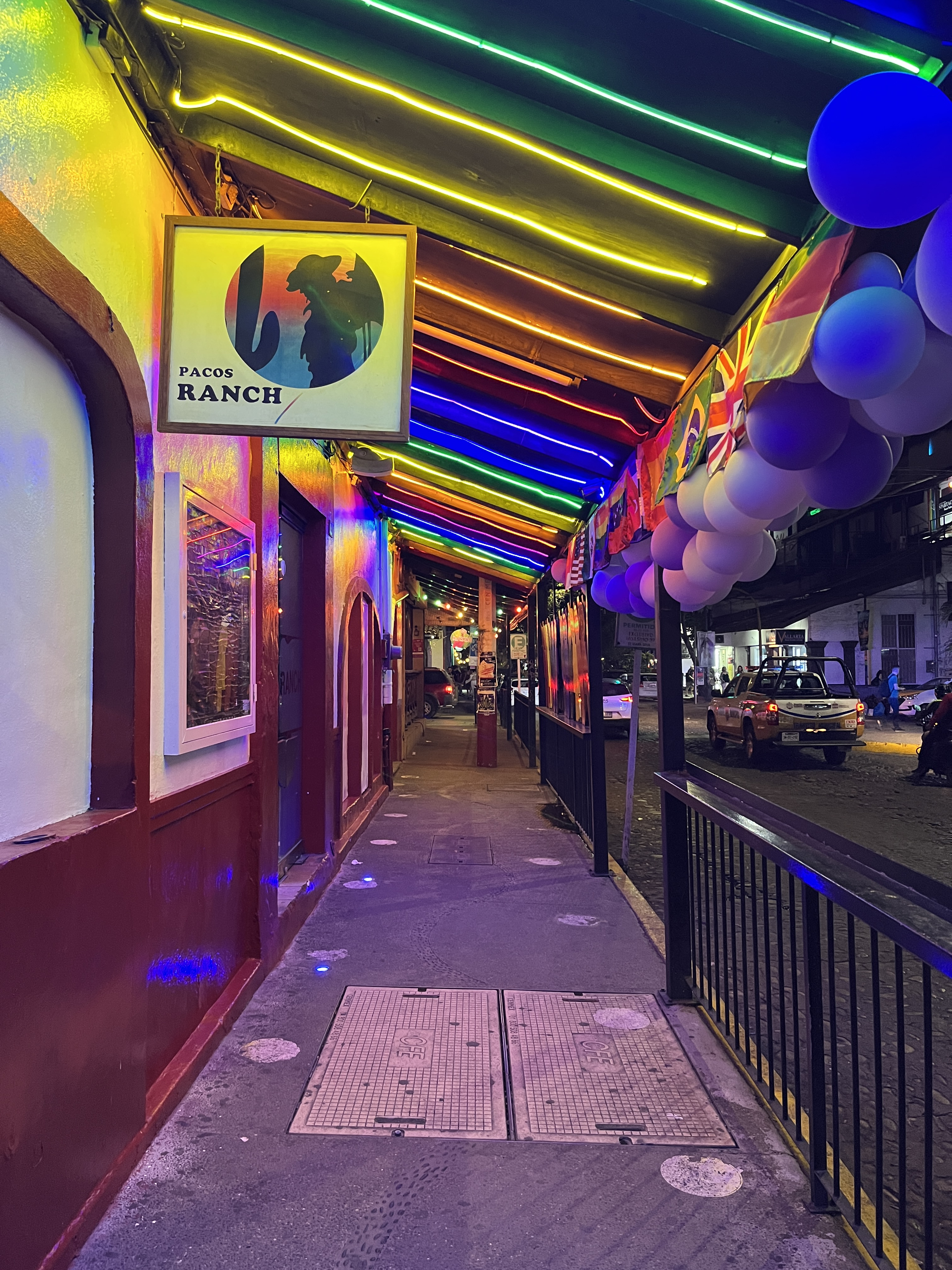
- The bar's entrance, 2023
- Interactive map of Paco's Ranch
- Address: Puerto Vallarta, Jalisco; Mexico
- Coordinates: 20.6038°N 105.2360°W

Website
- pacosranchpv.com

Paco's Ranch, also known as Club Paco Paco, is a gay bar in Zona Romántica, Puerto Vallarta, in the Mexican state of Jalisco.

== Description ==
Instinct magazine has called Paco's Ranch one of the city's most popular gay bars. Lonely Planet says, "This venerable disco-cantina stages smashing transvestite shows, with the music pumping loud. It's an amiable scene, with plenty of locals and reasonably priced drinks."

Puerto Vallarta Daily News says, "Don't let the humble name fool you, this is a big ol' discotheque, akin to something in Ibiza. The music is loud, the lights pulsating, and the dancing doesn't stop until 3 a.m. It's not the most sophisticated place in the world, but after a few rounds of tequila shots, you'll be dancing to "Y.M.C.A." with everyone else. Great drag shows, too." Passport Magazine has described the bar as a "racy, loud, crazy dance club that often features drag shows".

== History ==
In 2020, two people were shot and killed following a dispute amongst patrons.

== Reception ==
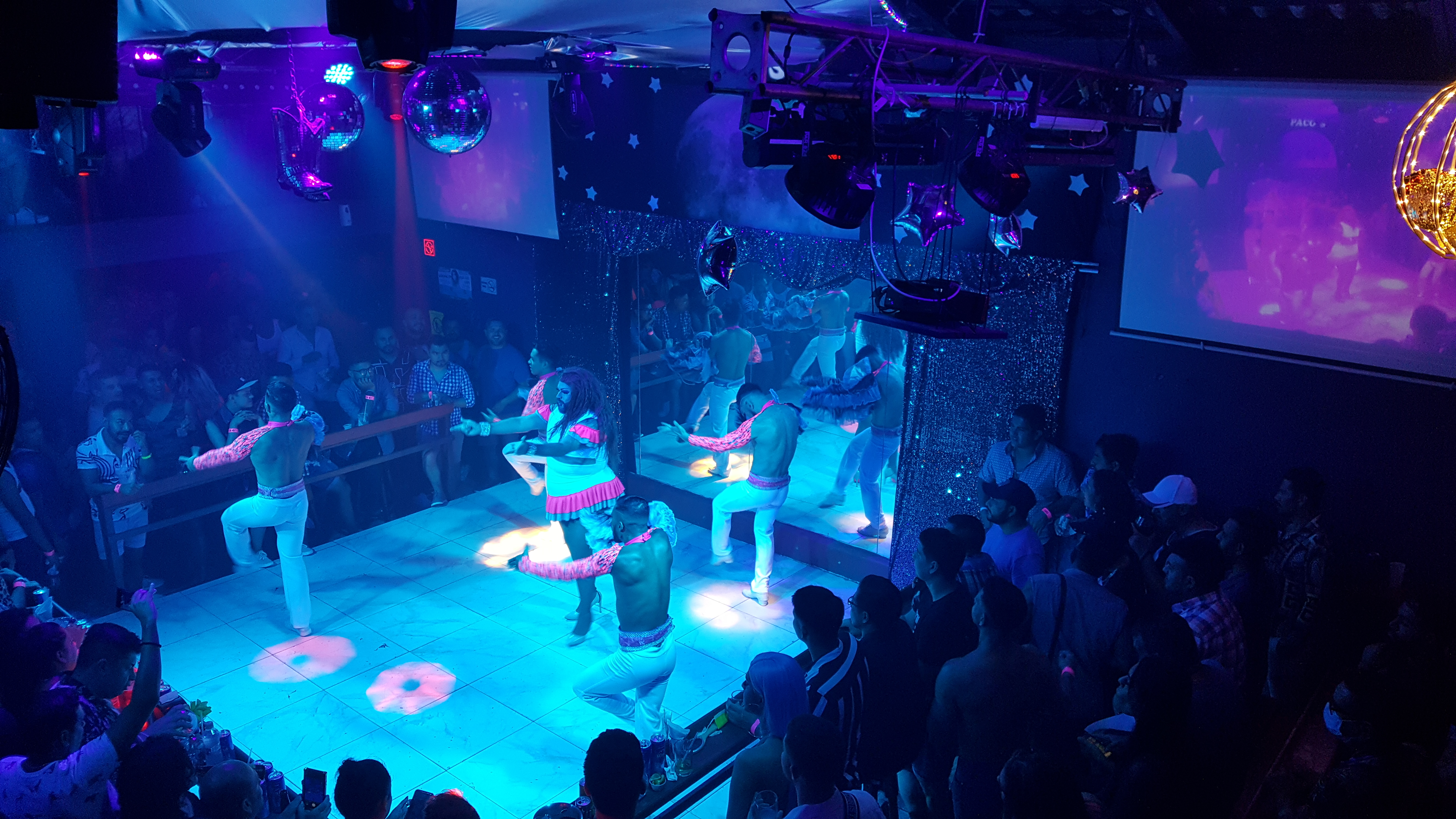
Drag performer with backup dancers on the venue's stage, 2021

In 2019, Thrillist's Meagan Drillinger said the bar is "as ridiculous and raunchy as it sounds. You've been warned." Amy Ashenden of PinkNews has described the bar as "the best place for drag shows", writing in 2020, "Paco’s is a medium-sized club with two floors that is known for its drag shows. Maybe it was hard to tell after all the mezcal but the crowd seemed a little too serious for young gays watching queens lip sync to Britney. Mostly popular with gay men and trans women, it wins the award for what has to be one of the most niche drag references to be made in Jalisco history – who knew Fleur East had a Mexican fan base?"

== See also ==
- List of LGBTQ bars
