= Mr. Flamingo =

Gay bar in Puerto Vallarta, Jalisco, Mexico

- Logo

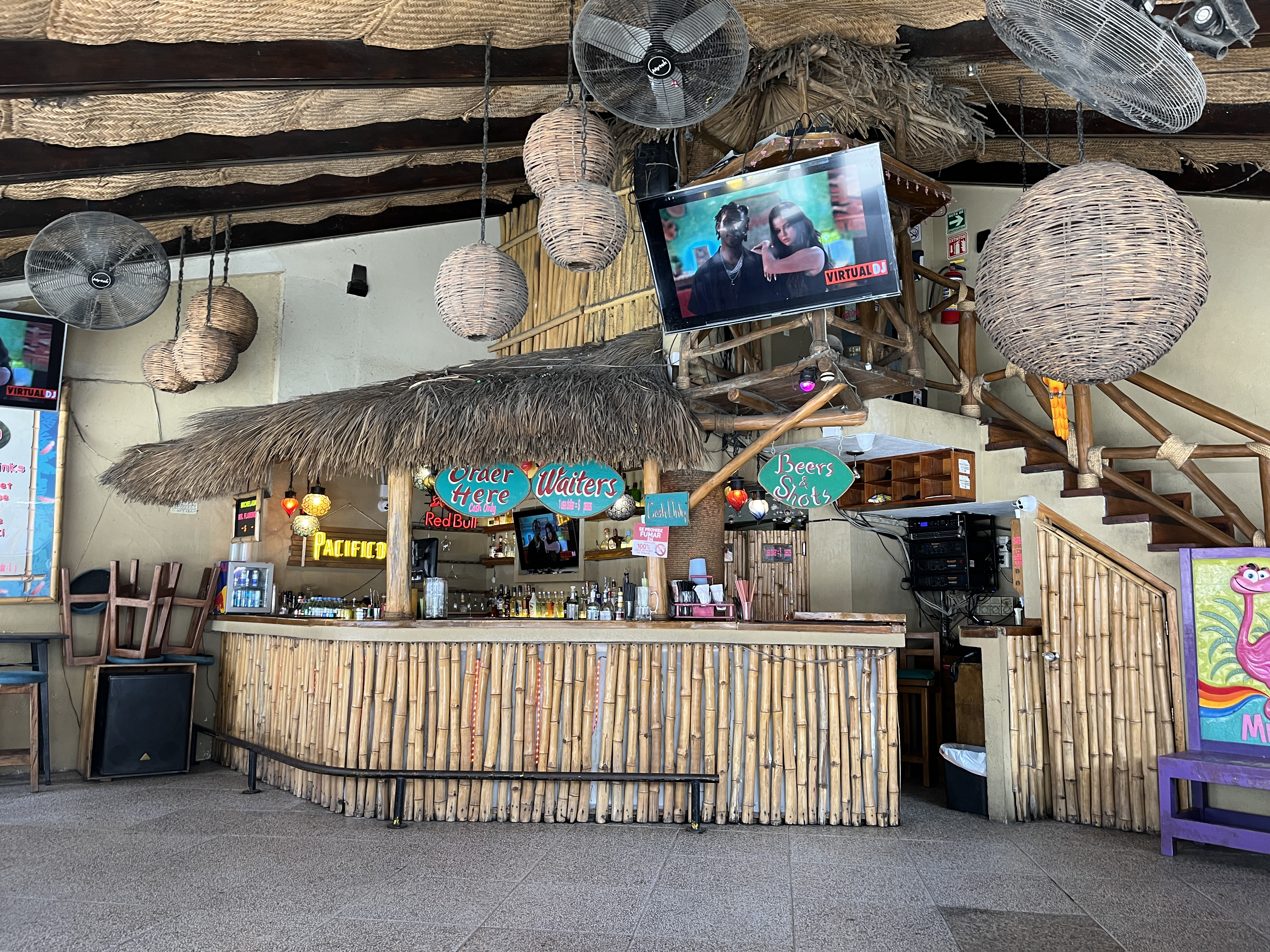
- The bar's interior, 2023
- Interactive map of Mr. Flamingo
- Address: Lázaro Cárdenas 247; Puerto Vallarta, Jalisco; Mexico
- Coordinates: 20.6036°N 105.2360°W

Mr. Flamingo is a gay bar in Zona Romántica, Puerto Vallarta, in the Mexican state of Jalisco.

== Description ==
Located at Ignacio L. Vallarta and Venustiano Carranza streets, the semi-open air establishment specifically caters to the LGBT community. Amy Ashenden of PinkNews described the bar as "small but very friendly and a seriously popular choice attracting the most mixed crowd" she saw in the city. In 2019, Thrillist's Meagan Drillinger wrote, "For all-night parties, you’ll want Mr. Flamingo, an open-air spot popular with the LGBT community but also completely non-discriminatory. At 7pm it’s a chill, sunset happy-hour bar, but it flips into full-on party mode by 7:30, spills out into the streets, and doesn’t lose momentum until around 3am."

== History ==
Javier Jimenez is the bar's owner. In 2021, Ed Walsh of the San Francisco Chronicle called the bar "wildly popular".

== Reception ==
In 2018, ChicagoPride.com's Jerry Nunn wrote, "Mr. Flamingo is so popular that the dancing continues in the streets surrounding it on Calle Larazo Cardenas. People enjoy the pop music with not a lot of variety most likely because they can sing along, three Shania Twain songs in an hour is a little much but that stopped no one from shaking their tail feathers all night." The bar was described as "always fun" in a 2020 guide published by Moon.

== See also ==
- List of LGBTQ bars
