= Reinas Bar =

Gay bar in Puerto Vallarta, Jalisco, Mexico

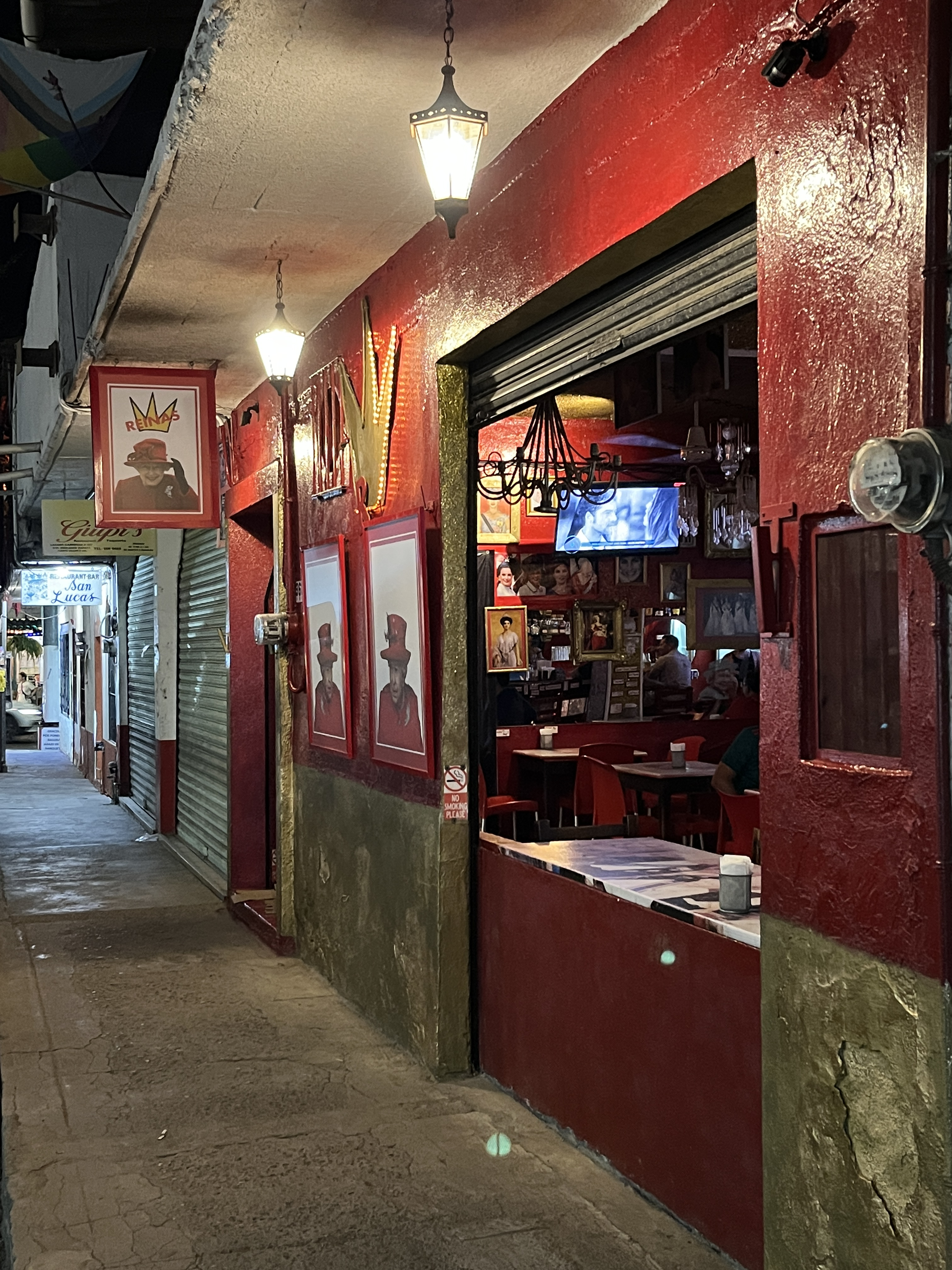
- The bar's exterior at night, 2023
- Interactive map of Reinas Bar

Restaurant information
- Established: October 8, 2010
- Owner: Marcus Van Groeningen
- Location: Lázaro Cárdenas 361, Puerto Vallarta, Jalisco, Mexico
- Coordinates: 20.6040°N 105.2337°W

Reinas Bar, or simply Reinas, is a gay bar in Zona Romántica, Puerto Vallarta, in the Mexican state of Jalisco. Owner Marcus Van Groeningen opened the bar in 2010.

== Description ==
Reinas Bar is a queen-themed gay bar in Zona Romántica. Out and About Puerto Vallarta has described Reinas as an LGBTQ-owned, "cozy friendly neighborhood bar" with a "great mix" of locals and foreigners. Reinas has dresses, hats, high-heeled shoes, makeup, and wigs available for guests to wear. According to Ed Walsh of the Bay Area Reporter, the bar is busiest before midnight.

The interior features many depictions of queens, as well as a large mirror in the shape of a crown. According to the magazine, "Everywhere you look – walls, doors, tables, – you'll see photos of the Queen of England, Princess Diane, along with tiaras, chandeliers, and a few other elements of British royalty." Salvador Dominguez of Out and About Puerto Vallarta said the images of Queen Elizabeth II and other royals "contrasts with the Mexican style of cantina". There are screens streaming music and videos from the 1980s in both English and Spanish. The menu includes beer, margaritas, mezcal, and tequilas.

== History ==
Owner Marcus Van Groeningen opened Reinas on October 8, 2010, in a space which previously housed Bar Frida, but had been unoccupied for approximately two years. During the permitting process, he spent three months decorating the space.

Van Groeningen and staff collect shoes to donate to children via Cheryl's Shoe Box annually. The theme for Reinas' twelfth anniversary party was "cowboys and cowgirls". The bar hosted a viewing party for the Academy Awards in 2019.

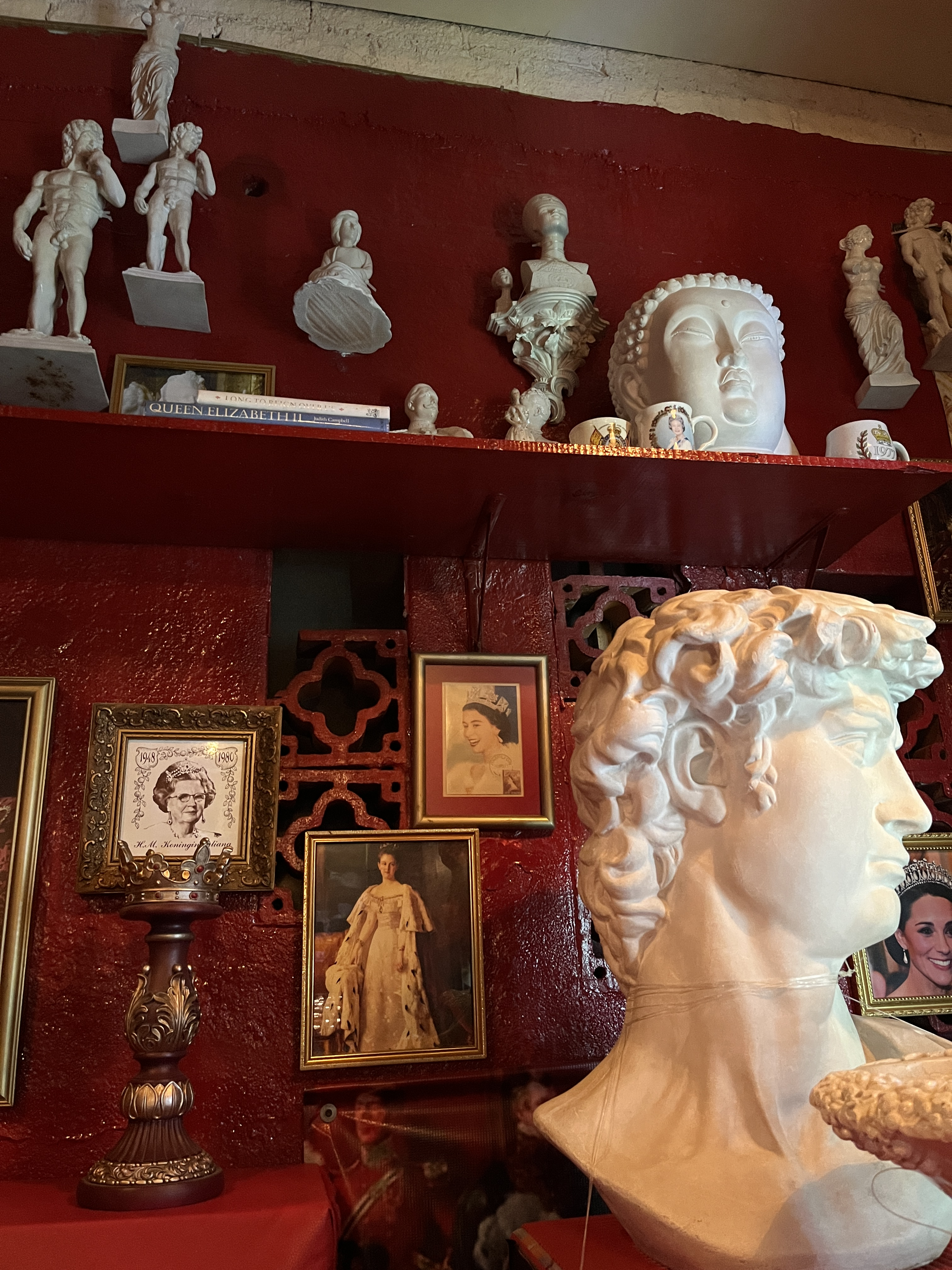
The bar's interior, 2023

Like most businesses, Reinas had to close temporary during the COVID-19 pandemic. In June 2020, as part of the city's annual LGBT pride festivities, the bar hosted the virtual session "Tea with the Queen". Operations were restored by July 2020.

In August 2021, Reinas closed again for the rest of the month because of regulations enacted by the local government requiring bars to have operating kitchens. The owner wrote, "Hello my dear friends, clients… sad news, but I have decided to close the bar, until the first of September or when it is indicated that it can be opened normally. After 2 more bars closed yesterday I can't take the risk. I'm really sorry especially for Curiel, Angel, Ivanka, Lalo, Yair and Abram. I'm really sorry, please come back when the bar is open again. Frame. God save the queen!"

== Reception ==
Iñigo Alkorta of Vallarta Lifestyles called Reinas "emblematic" in 2020. In 2021, Out and About Puerto Vallarta said the staff "do their best to make you feel like family". In 2022, the magazine's Salvador Dominguez wrote, "If you like kitsch more, Reinas will definitely be your place... In Reinas you can have a drink and at the same time talk without so much noise or bustle... [Their] prices are cheap and they have a personalized treatment from the owner and waiters who are adorable."

== See also ==
- List of LGBTQ bars
