= Soto =

Soto may refer to:

== Geography ==
- Soto (Aller), parish in Asturias, Spain
- Soto (Las Regueras), parish in Asturias, Spain
- Soto, Curaçao, Netherlands Antilles
- Soto, Russia, a rural locality (a selo) in Megino-Kangalassky District of the Sakha Republic, Russia
- Soto de Cerrato, municipality in Palencia Province, Spain
- Soto de la Vega, municipality in León Province, Spain
- Soto de los Infantes, parish in Asturias, Spain
- Soto de Luiña, parish in Asturias, Spain
- Soto del Barco (parish), parish in Asturias, Spain
- Soto del Real, municipality in Madrid Province, Spain
- Soto en Cameros, municipality in La Rioja, Spain
- Soto la Marina, Tamaulipas, municipality in Mexico
- Soto Street, in Los Angeles, California
  - Soto (Los Angeles Metro station), located on Soto Street at the intersection with First St.
- Soto y Amío, municipality in León Province, Spain

== Groups of people ==
- So'to, indigenous people of the Amazon
- Sōtō, the largest of the three traditional sects of Zen in Japanese Buddhism

== People with the name ==
=== Given name or nickname ===
- Soto Grimshaw (1833–1900), Argentine naturalist
- Sotirios Kyrgiakos (born 1979), retired Greek footballer, nicknamed Soto

=== Surname ===
- Alberto Soto (footballer, born 1990) (born 1990), Mexican footballer
- Alejandro Morera Soto (1909–1995), Costa Rican footballer
- Algenis Perez Soto, Dominican actor
- Andrey Soto (born 2003), Costa Rican footballer
- Antonio Soto (syndicalist), Spanish-born syndicalist in Argentina
- Apolinar de Jesús Soto Quesada (1827–1911), Costa Rican politician
- Bernardo Soto Alfaro (1854–1931), president of Costa Rica
- Blanca Soto (born 1979), Mexican model
- Caitro Soto (1934–2004), Peruvian musician
- Carlos Soto Arriví (1959–1978), Puerto Rican independence activist
- Cecilia Soto (born 1950), Mexican politician
- Cesar Soto (boxer) (born 1971), Mexican boxer, former WBC featherweight champion
- Clemente Soto Vélez (1905–1993), Puerto Rican writer and journalist
- Cynthia Soto, American politician
- Daniel Garcia Soto, Puerto Rican wrestler
- Darren Soto (born 1978), American politician
- Eddie Soto (born 1972), American soccer player
- Edra Soto (born 1971), Puerto Rican multidisciplinary artist and curator
- Elías M. Soto (1858–1944), Colombian musician and composer
- Elkin Soto (born 1980), Colombian footballer
- Elliot Soto (born 1989), American baseball player
- Felix Soto Toro (born 1967), Puerto Rican NASA engineer
- Fernando Soto-Hay y Garcia
- Francisco Puertas Soto (born 1963), Spanish rugby player
- Freddy Soto (1970–2005), American comedian
- Gabriel Soto (born 1975), Mexican model and actor
- Gary Soto (born 1952), American author and poet
- Geovany Soto (born 1983), Puerto Rican baseball player
- Gregory Soto (born 1995), Dominican baseball pitcher
- Héctor Soto (born 1978), Puerto Rican volleyball player
- Hernando de Soto (c. 1496–1542), Spanish explorer who was recorded to be the first European to cross the Mississippi River
- Hortensia Soto, Mexican-American mathematician
- Humberto Soto (born 1980), Mexican boxer
- Iván Hernández Soto (born 1980), Spanish footballer
- Iván Sánchez-Rico Soto (aka Riki; b. 1980), Spanish footballer
- Jafet Soto (born 1976), Costa Rican footballer
- Jaime Soto (born 1955), American Roman Catholic bishop
- Jay Soto, American jazz guitarist
- Jeff Scott Soto (born 1965), American singer
- Jesús Rafael Soto (1923–2005), Venezuelan artist
- Jock Soto, former New York City Ballet principal dancer
- Joel Soto (born 1982), Chilean footballer
- Jorge Soto (footballer) (born 1971), Peruvian footballer
- Jorge Soto (golfer) (1945–2011), Argentine golfer
- Jorge Azanza Soto (born 1982), Spanish bicycle racer
- José Soto (disambiguation)
- Jose Luis de Quintanar Soto y Ruiz (1772–1837), Mexican military officer
- Josu De Solaun Soto (born 1982), Spanish pianist
- Juan Soto (born 1998), Dominican baseball player
- Juan Soto (referee) (born 1977), Venezuelan football referee
- Julián Martínez Soto (1921–2000), Spanish-born Mexican sculptor
- Lindsay Soto (born 1976), American sports journalist
- Lisa Soto Visual artist based in Los Angeles, California
- Liván Soto (born 2000), Venezuelan baseball player
- Lornna Soto (born 1970), Puerto Rican politician
- Luis Gutiérrez Soto (1890–1977), Spanish architect
- Manuel Ángel Núñez Soto (born 1951), Mexican politician
- Marco Aurelio Soto (1846–1908), President of Honduras
- Mario Soto (baseball) (born 1956), Dominican baseball player
- Mario Soto (footballer, born 1950), Chilean footballer
- Maritza Soto (born 1990), Chilean astronomer
- Marleyda Soto (born 1977), Colombian actress
- Máximo Soto Hall (1871–1944), Guatemalan novelist
- Miriam Blasco Soto (born 1963), Spanish judoka
- Nell Soto (1926–2009), American politician
- Onell Soto (1932–2015), American Episcopal bishop
- Pablo Soto (software developer) (born 1979), Spanish computer scientist
- Pedro Blanco Soto (1789–1825), President of Bolivia
- Pedro Juan Soto (1928–2002), Puerto Rican writer
- Roberto Soto (born 1948), Puerto Rican wrestler
- Rodolfo Campo Soto (born 1942), Colombian politician
- Santiago Cervera Soto (born 1965), Spanish politician
- Sebastian Soto (soccer, born 2000), American-Chilean soccer player
- Sebastián Soto (footballer, born 1991), Argentinian football
- Steve Soto (born 1963), American musician
- Talisa Soto (born 1967), American model and actress
- Ubaldo Soto (born 2006), Dominican baseball player
- Victoria Leigh Soto (1985–2012), American teacher and murder victim
- Wanda Soto Tolentino, Puerto Rican politician

== Arts, entertainment, and media ==
- Captain Soto, a character in Ninjago
- Soto, the main antagonist in Ice Age (2002 film)
- SOTO, a rock band led by Jeff Scott Soto

== Other uses ==
- Soto (food) or Coto, a dish originally from Indonesia
  - Soto ayam, a chicken soup
  - Soto mie, a noodle soup
- Soto (restaurant), New York City
- Spirit of the Outback, a passenger train service between Brisbane and Longreach, Queensland, Australia

== See also ==
- De Soto (disambiguation)
- Sotho (disambiguation)
