= Santullano =

Santullano, Santuyano or Santuyanu may refer to:

- Santullano (Salas), a parish in northern Spain
- Santuyano (Mieres) a parish in Asturias, northern Spain
- Santuyanu (Les Regueres), a parish in northern Spain
- San Julián (Bimenes) (Asturian: Santuyano, official name is bilingual)
- San Julián de los Prados or Santullano, a church in Oviedo, Spain
