= Cabo San Antonio =

Cabo San Antonio is Spanish for "Cape San Antonio", and may refer to:

Places

- Cape San Antonio, Argentina
- Cape San Antonio, Cuba
- Cape San Antonio, Spain

Ships

- ARA Cabo San Antonio (Q-42), an Argentine Navy tank landing ship decommissioned in 1997
