= DeSoto County =

DeSoto County is the name of two counties in the United States of America:

- DeSoto County, Florida
- DeSoto County, Mississippi

== See also ==
- De Soto (disambiguation)
- DeSoto Parish, Louisiana
- USS De Soto County (LST-1171), a post-war Landing Ship Tank of the US Navy
