= John Sherrill =

John Sherrill may refer to:

- John Lewis Sherrill, Christian writer
- John Scott Sherrill, American songwriter

== See also ==
- John Sherrill Houser, American painter and sculptor
