= Las Regueras =

- Municipality
- Coat of arms

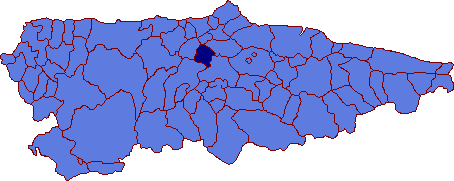

- Location in Spain
- Coordinates: 43°24.8′N 5°58.2′W
- Country: Spain
- Autonomous community: Asturias
- Province: Asturias
- Comarca: Oviedo
- Judicial district: Oviedo
- Capital: Santullano

Government
  - Alcalde: José Miguel Tamargo (PSOE)

Area
  - Total: 65.85 km^{2} (25.42 sq mi)
- Highest elevation: 626 m (2,054 ft)

Population (2025-01-01)
  - Total: 1,892
  - Density: 28.73/km^{2} (74.42/sq mi)
- Time zone: UTC+1 (CET)
  - Summer (DST): UTC+2 (CEST)
- Postal code: 33190
- Website: Official website

Las Regueras (Les Regueres in Asturian) is a municipality in the Autonomous Community of the Principality of Asturias, Spain. It is bordered on the north by Illas and Llanera, on the south by Grado, on the west by Candamo, and on the east by Oviedo and Llanera.

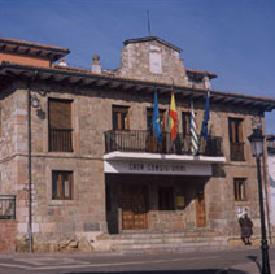
Municipal Hall of Las Regueras in Santullano

== Parishes ==
- Biedes
- L'Escampleru
- Santuyanu
- Sotu
- Tresmonte
- Valdunu

== Politics ==
	PSOE	PP	Otros	Total
2003	7	4	0	11
2007	7	4	0	11

== Notable people ==
- Ramón González (1888–1952), socialist trade union leader

== See also ==
- List of municipalities in Asturias
