= Biedes =

- Parish
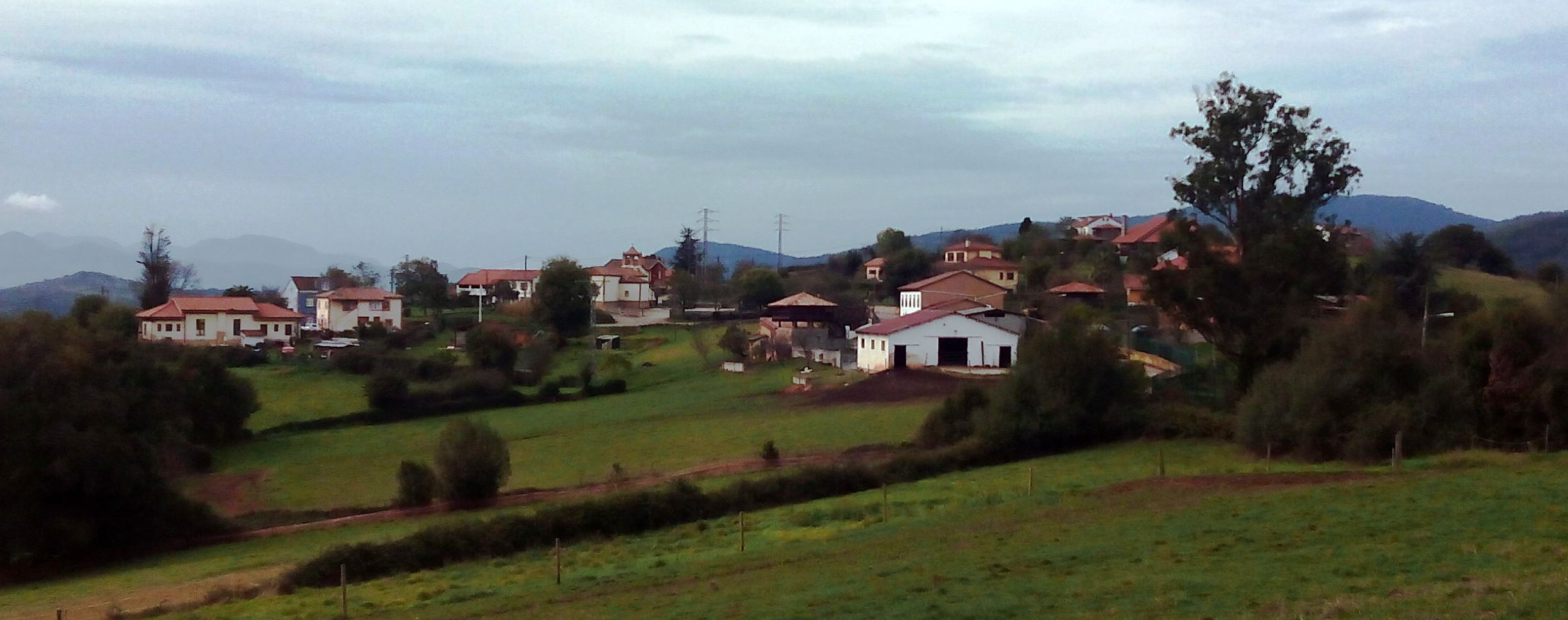

- Location within Spain
- Coordinates: 43.433333°N 5.933333°W
- Country: Spain
- Autonomous community: Asturias
- Province: Asturias
- Municipality: Las Regueras

Population (2011)
  - Total: 279

Biedes is one of six parishes (administrative divisions) in Las Regueras, a municipality within the province and autonomous community of Asturias, in northern Spain.

The population is 279 (INE 2011).

== Villages and Hamlets ==
- Biedes
  - Figuera
  - El Riegu
  - La Campina
  - Xugal
- La Braña
- La Estaca
- Mariñes
  - L'Averín
  - Cadagüelu
  - Cimavilla
  - La Pereda
  - La Proída
- Miobra
- Parades
  - Airaos
  - El Barriu de Riba
  - El Barriu de Baxu
  - Tuxa
  - La Corredoria
  - Grandellana
  - En Ca Celu
  - En Ca Pachu
  - La Marguera
  - La Piedra
  - Los Pontones
  - La Rubial
  - Recastañosu
