= Valdunu =

Coordinates: 43.4°N 6°W

Valdunu (Spanish: Valduno) is one of six parishes (administrative divisions) in Les Regueres, a municipality within the province and autonomous community of Asturias, in northern Spain.

The population is 286 (INE 2011).

== Villages ==
- Areces
- Bolgues
- Cuetu
- La Fonte
- Paladín
- Premoño
- Puerma
- Valdunu
