= Statue of Lázaro Cárdenas (Madrid) =

Statue in Spain

Lázaro Cárdenas
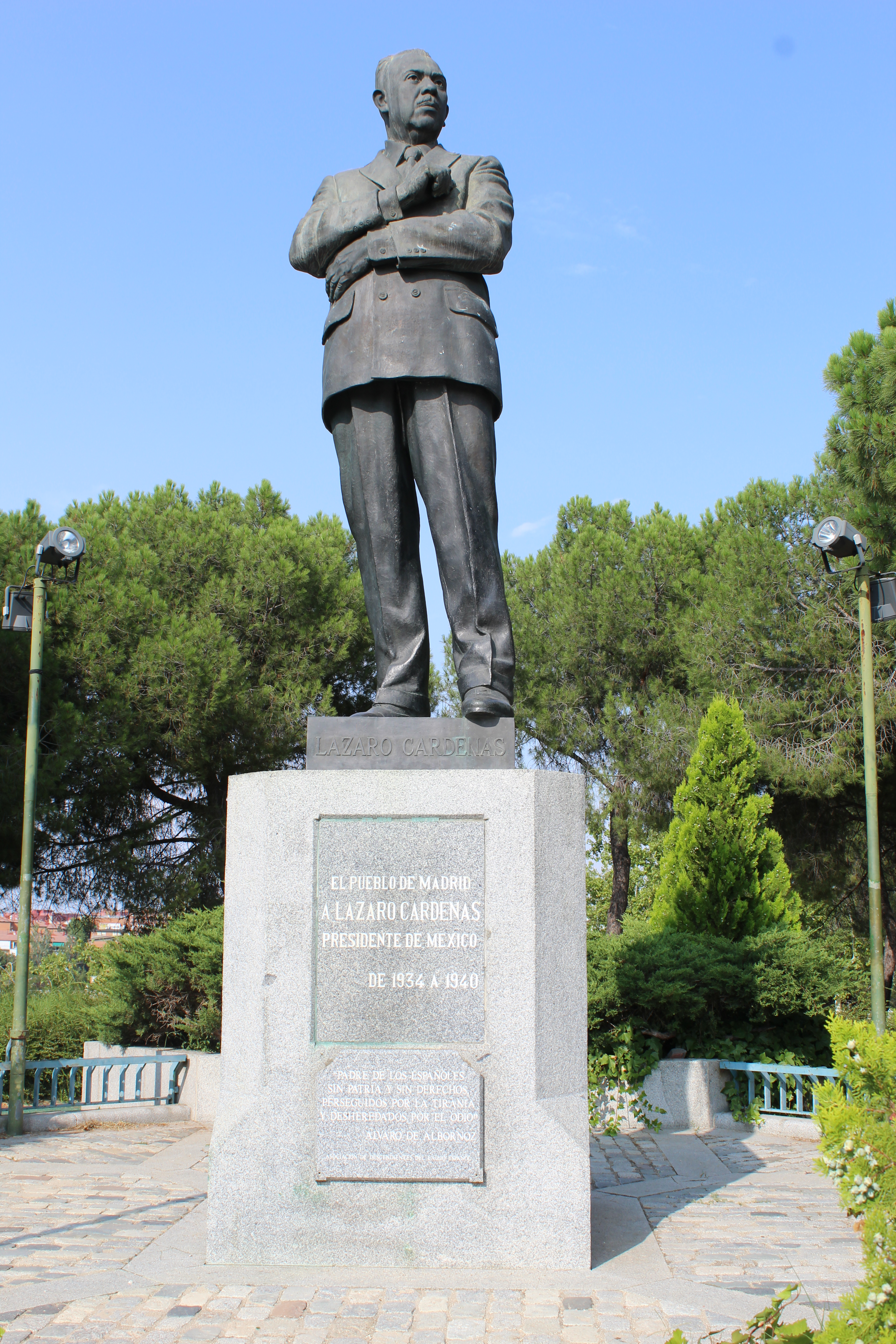
- Interactive map of Lázaro Cárdenas
- Location: Parque Norte, Madrid, Spain
- Coordinates: 40.480228°N 3.691156°W
- Designer: Julián Martínez Soto
- Material: Bronze, granite
- Height: 3.50 m (statue)
- Opening date: 16 November 1983
- Dedicated to: Lázaro Cárdenas

The Statue of Lázaro Cárdenas is an instance of public art in Madrid, Spain. Erected at the Parque Norte, it pays homage to Mexican President Lázaro Cárdenas, noted for welcoming into Mexico thousands of Spanish Republican exiles fleeing the Spanish Civil War and the ensuing Francoist dictatorship.

== History and description ==
A homage to Lázaro Cárdenas, the Mexican President who welcomed about 30,000 Spanish Republican exiles fleeing the Spanish Civil War and the ensuing Francoist dictatorship, was one of the first decisions taken by the democratic municipal corporation formed after the 1979 Madrid municipal election, passed in the first meeting session of the plenary of the Ayuntamiento. Costs of the structure were funded by the Ayuntamiento, while the statue was financed via popular subscription among the Spanish Republican community in Mexico. Initially intending to erect a bust, they reportedly collected so much money a full-body statue was commissioned.

The design of the project was awarded to Mexican sculptor Julián Martínez Soto, himself a Spanish exile who arrived to Mexico when he was young. Standing 3.5 metre high, the full-body statue turned up to be too big for its original tentative location at the Plaza del Presidente Cárdenas (dedicated in 1982), so a new location at the Parque Norte was eventually decided by the Ayuntamiento. Cast in bronze in Mexico, the costs for the transportation of the monument to Madrid were also funded by the Spanish Republican community in Mexico. Joaquín Roldán and Santiago Cubero had a role in the erection of the monument as architects.

The monument was unveiled on 16 November 1983 during a ceremony attended by Enrique Tierno Galván (Mayor of Madrid), Ramón Aguirre (Head of Mexico City), Amalia Solórzano (widow of Cárdenas), Cuauhtémoc Cárdenas (son of Cárdenas), Enrique Barón, Joaquín Leguina and José Federico de Carvajal, among others.

The two initial plaques added to the monument read: "el pueblo de madrid / a lázaro cárdenas / presidente de méxico (de 1934 a 1940)" ("The people of Madrid, to Lázaro Cárdenas, President of Mexico (from 1934 to 1940)" and "el exilio republicano / español / con honda gratitud / y reconocimiento / a lázaro cárdenas / presidente de méxico" ("the Spanish Republican exile with deep gratitude and recognition to Lázaro Cárdenas, President of Mexico").

Following an initiative of the Association of Descendants of the Spanish Exile, a new plaque reading "padre de los españoles sin patria y sin derechos, perseguidos por la tiranía y desheredados por el odio" ("father of the Spaniards without homeland and without rights, persecuted by tyranny and disinherited by hate"), a quote dedicated to Cárdenas by Álvaro de Albornoz upon the latter's arrival to Mexico as exile, was unveiled in October 2005.

== See also ==
- Statue of Lázaro Cárdenas (Puerto Vallarta)
