= L'Escampleru =

Coordinates: 43.4°N 5.95°W

L'Escampleru (Spanish: Valsera) is one of six parishes (administrative divisions) in Les Regueres, a municipality within the province and autonomous community of Asturias, in northern Spain.

The population is 616 (INE 2011).

== Villages and Hamlets ==
- L'Escampleru
  - L'Algodante
  - La Carcavina
  - La Casanueva
  - La Chabola
  - El Trechoriu
  - El Charcón
  - El Monte
  - La Peñosa
  - Sienra
  - La Venta
  - La Verruga
- Gallegos
- Pumeda
- Quexu
  - La Rebollada
  - Corquéu
  - Sirviella
- Rañeces
- San Pedru Nora
- Taoces
  - El Caleyón
  - Cimavilla
  - El Forcón
  - La Nozaliega
  - El Villar
- Tamargu
  - La Cerra
  - Llanadoriu
  - La Malena
  - El Palaciu
  - Taraniellu
  - La Trecha
- Valsera
  - La Cruz
  - La Rabaza
  - Reconcu
  - Los Arroxos
  - El Cuétare
  - Quintos
  - El Campanal
  - El Picarín
