= De Soto =

De Soto commonly refers to

- Hernando de Soto (c. 1500 – 1542), Spanish explorer
- DeSoto (automobile), an American automobile brand from 1928 to 1961

De Soto, DeSoto, Desoto, or de Soto may also refer to:

== Places in the United States of America ==
Populated places

- De Soto, Georgia
- De Soto, Illinois
- De Soto, Iowa
- De Soto, Kansas
- De Soto, Mississippi
- De Soto, Missouri
- De Soto, Nebraska
- De Soto, Wisconsin
- DeSoto, Indiana
- DeSoto, Texas, the most populous De Soto in the US

Administrative divisions

- De Soto Parish, Louisiana
- DeSoto County, Florida
- DeSoto County, Mississippi

Parks and geographic features

- De Soto National Forest in Mississippi
- DeSoto Falls (Alabama)
- DeSoto Falls (Georgia)
- DeSoto Lake, a lake in Georgia
- DeSoto National Wildlife Refuge, in Nebraska and Iowa
- Fort De Soto Park in St. Petersburg, Florida
- De Soto National Memorial in Bradenton, Florida
- DeSoto Site Historic State Park in Tallahassee, Florida

== People ==
- de Soto (surname)

== Other uses ==
- The DeSoto, historic hotel in Savannah, Georgia
- DESOTO patrols, conducted by the U.S. Navy to collect signals intelligence in hostile waters
- DeSoto Records, a record label
- USS De Soto County (LST-1171), a post-war Landing Ship Tank of the US Navy
- De Soto station, Los Angeles
- De Soto Avenue, Los Angeles

== See also ==
- Soto (disambiguation)
