= Parque Xicoténcatl =

Park in Coyoacán, Mexico City

Coordinates: 19.3565°N 99.1508°W

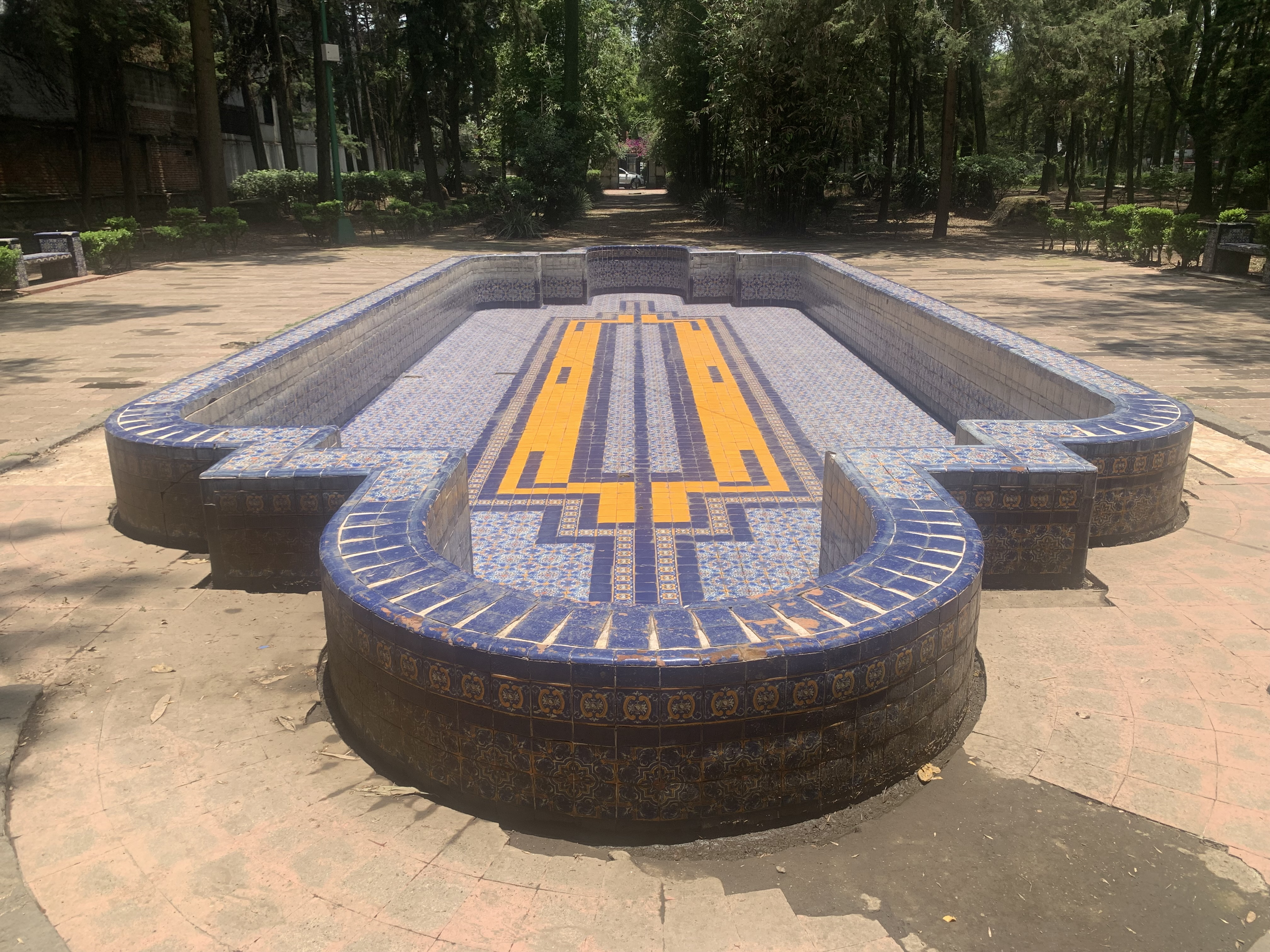
Talavera fountain in Parque Xicoténcatl

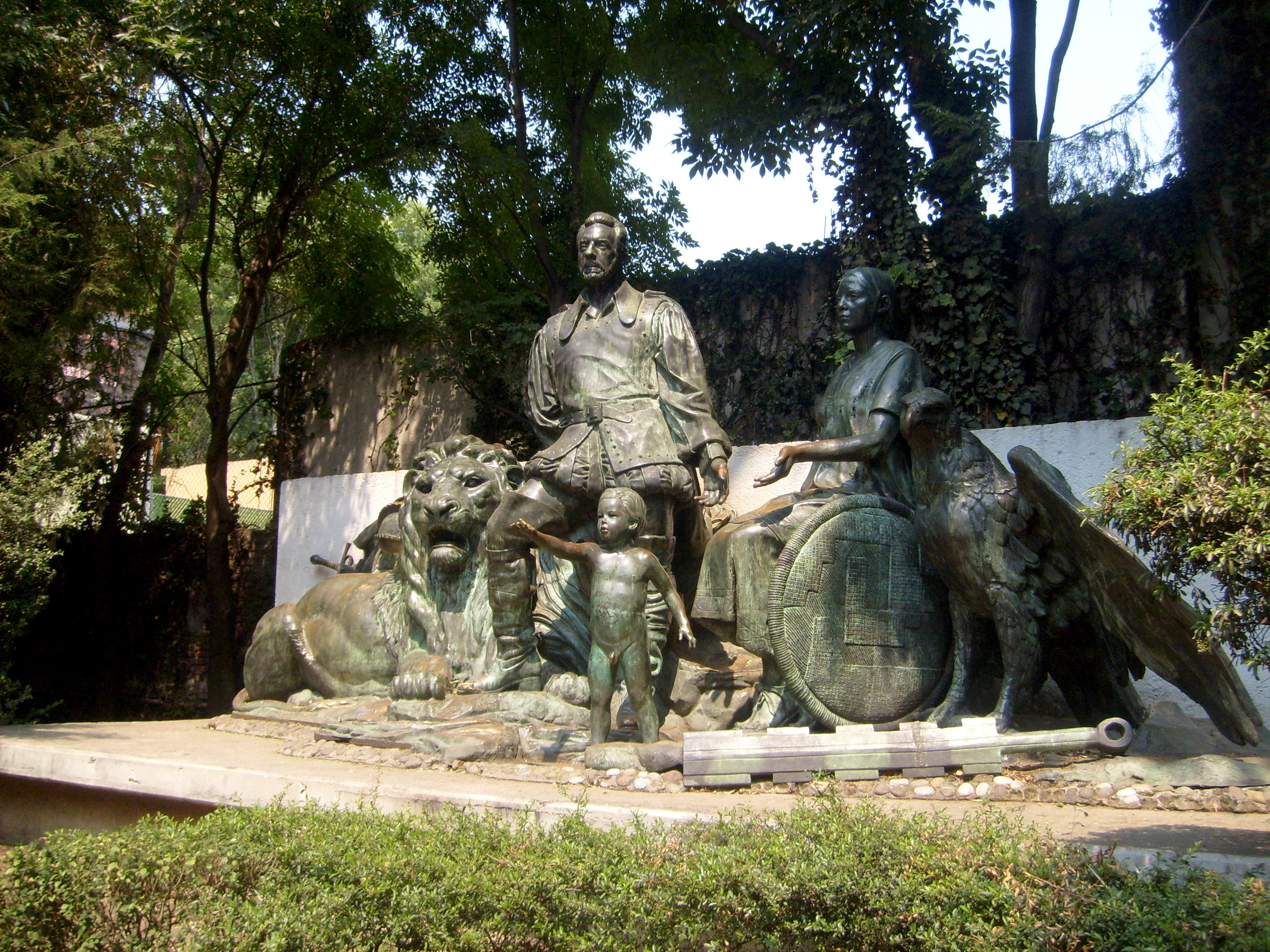
Monumento al mestizaje by Julián Martínez Soto

Parque Xicoténcatl is a public park in the Churubusco neighborhood of Coyoacán, Mexico City. It is located across from the Museo Nacional de las Intervenciones, which details foreign attacks since Mexican independence. The park is named after warrior prince Xicotencatl II of the Tlaxcala who was executed in 1521 after the fall of Tenochtitlan.

The park was derelict prior to being nationalized and given its current name in 1965. It contains 6,000 m^{2} of trees and three talavera azulejo water fountains.

President José López Portillo commissioned a sculpture of Hernán Cortés, Doña Marina, and their son Martín. The 1981 statue, Monumento al mestizaje by Julián Martínez Soto, was originally placed in front of Cortés's house in Coyoacán. After López Portillo left office, the sculpture was moved to Parque Xicoténcatl.

The park also houses busts of Lázaro Cárdenas and Georgi Dimitrov.

== Gallery ==
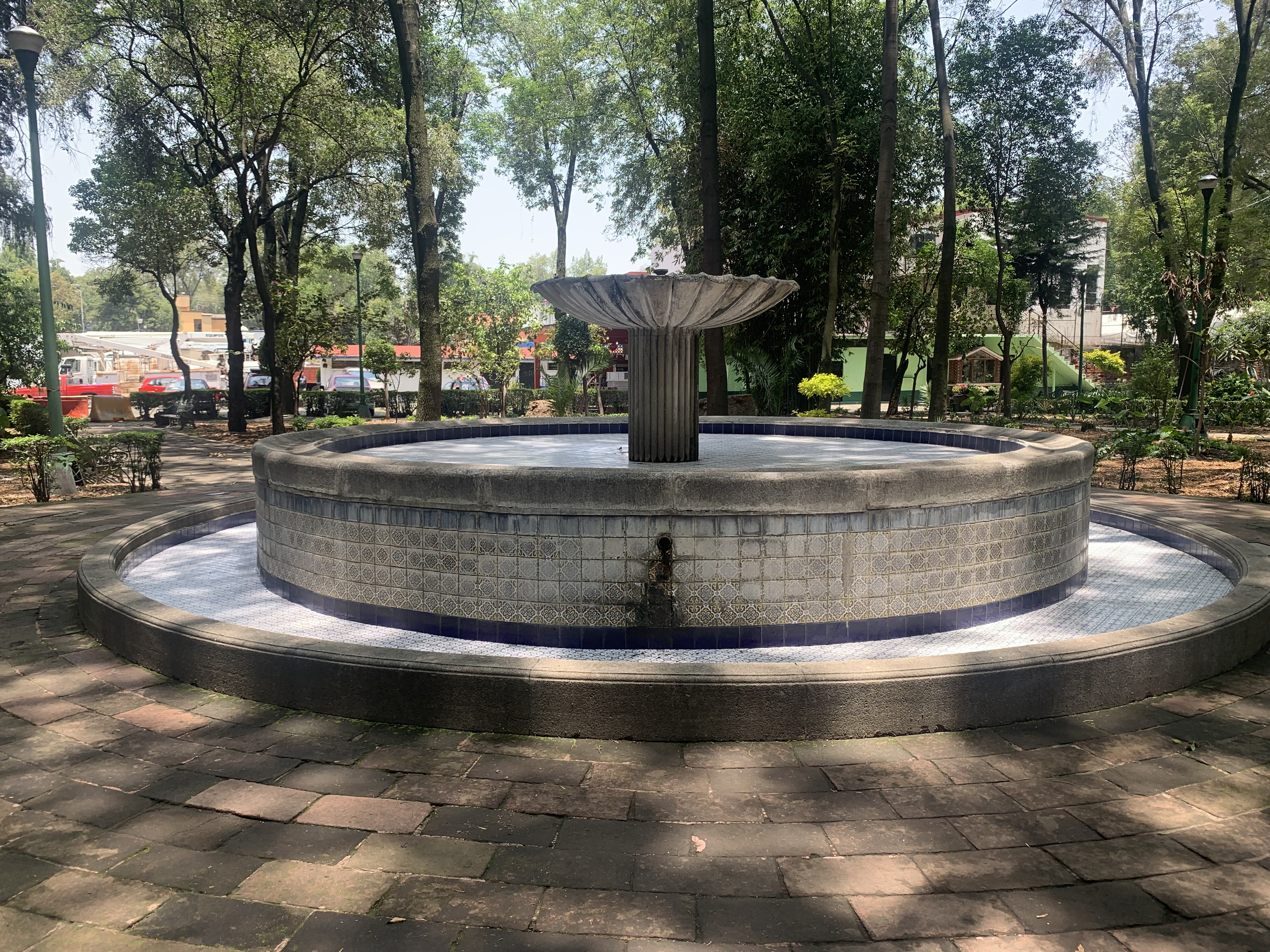

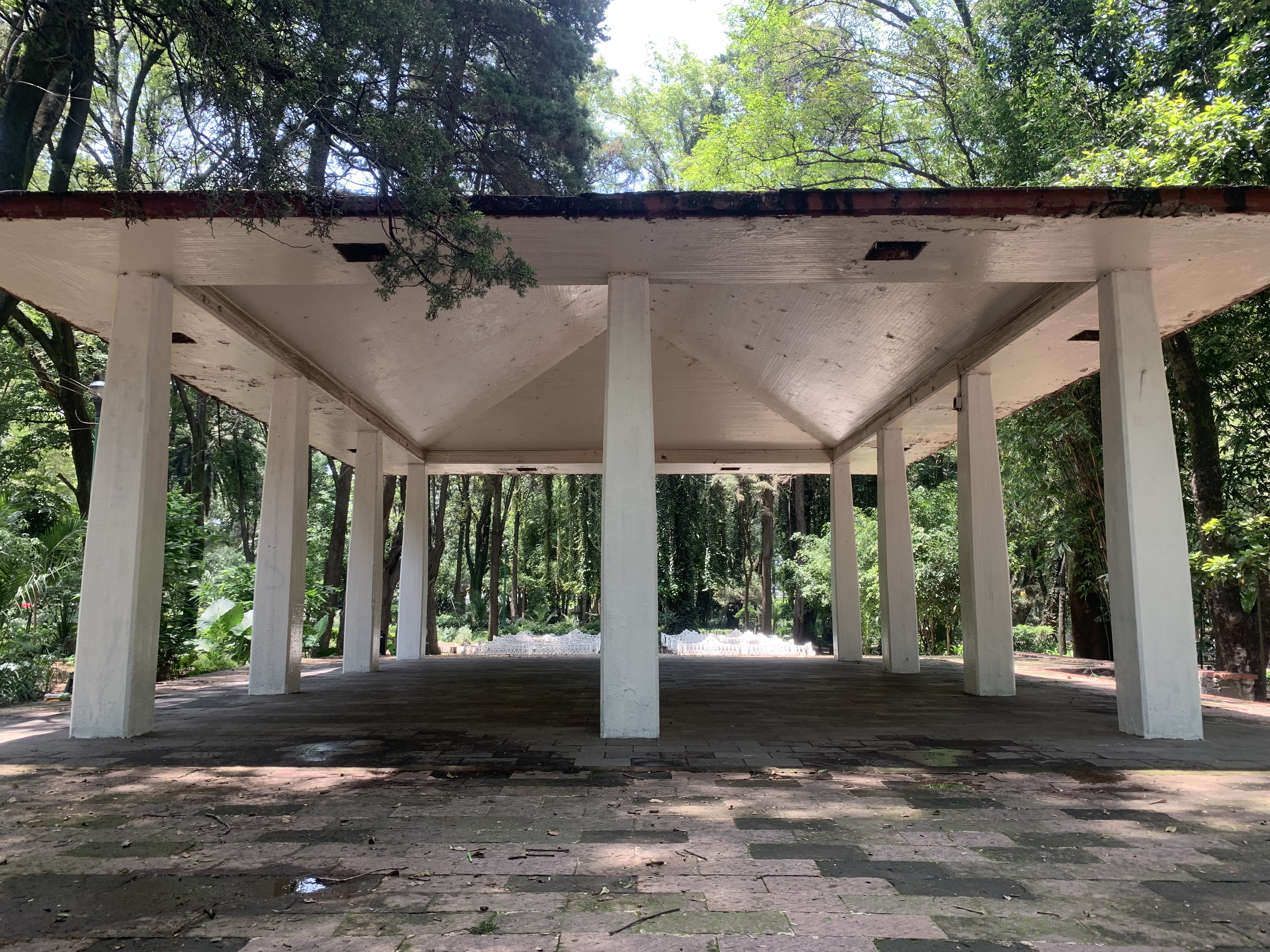

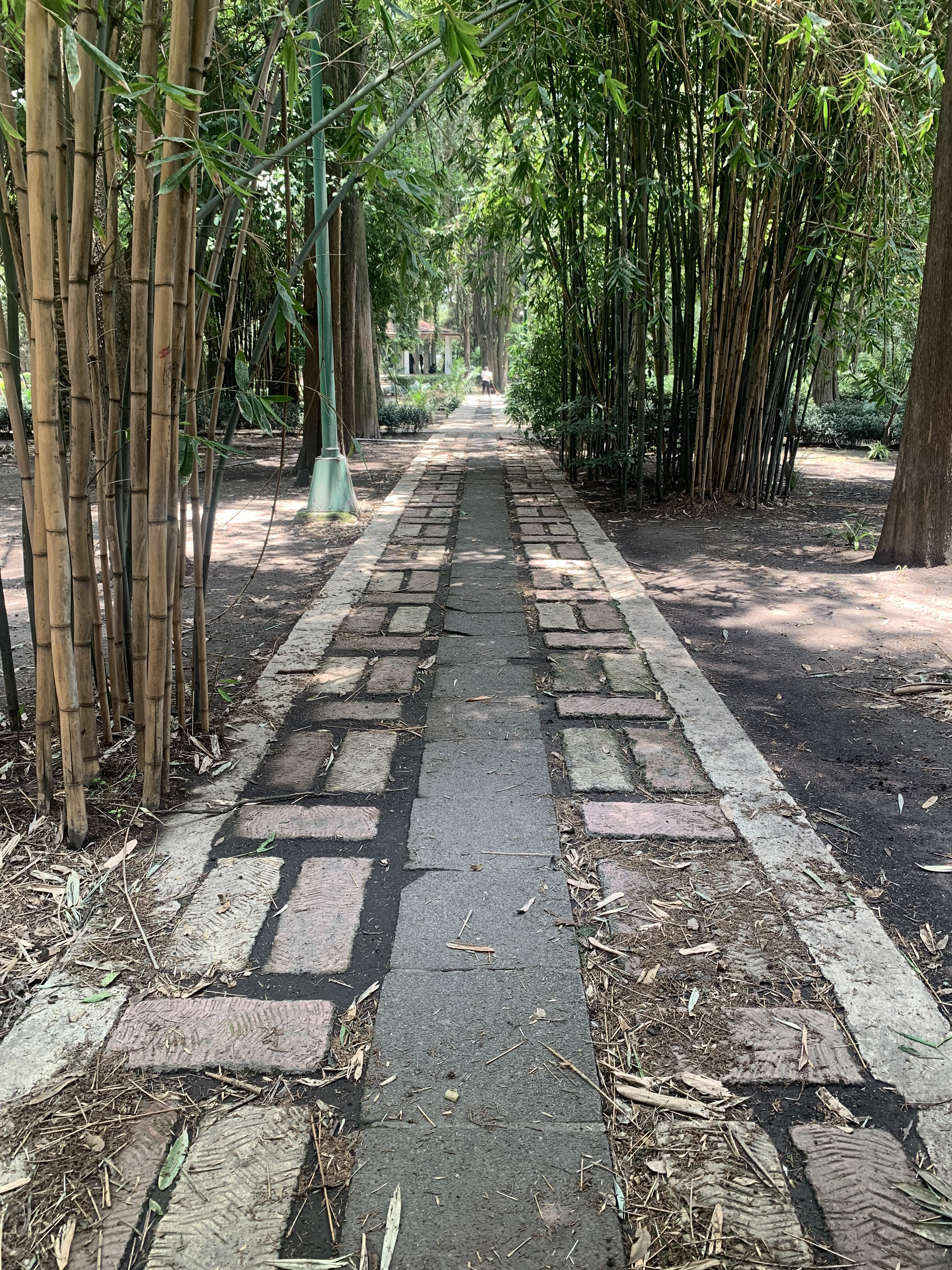

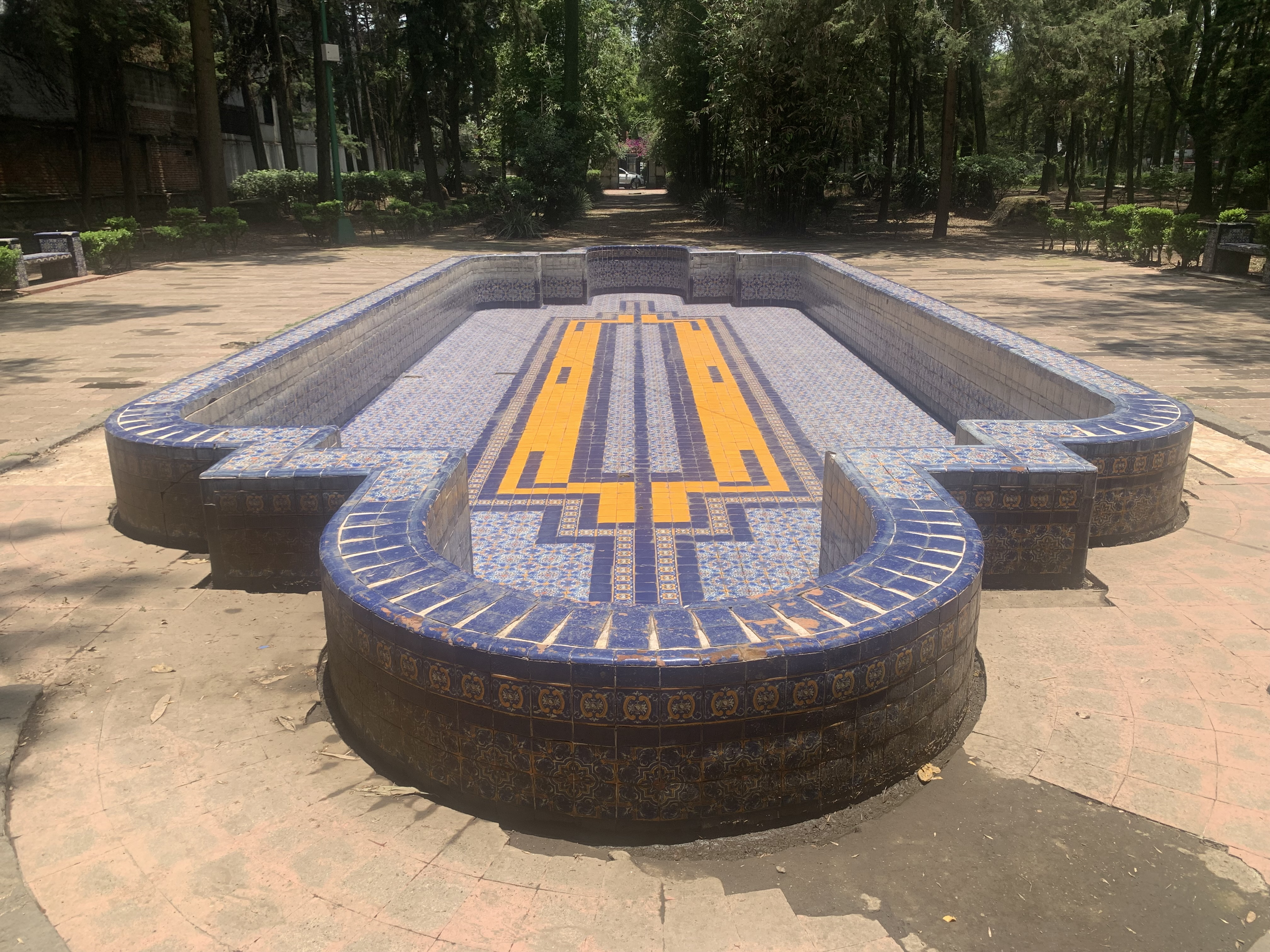

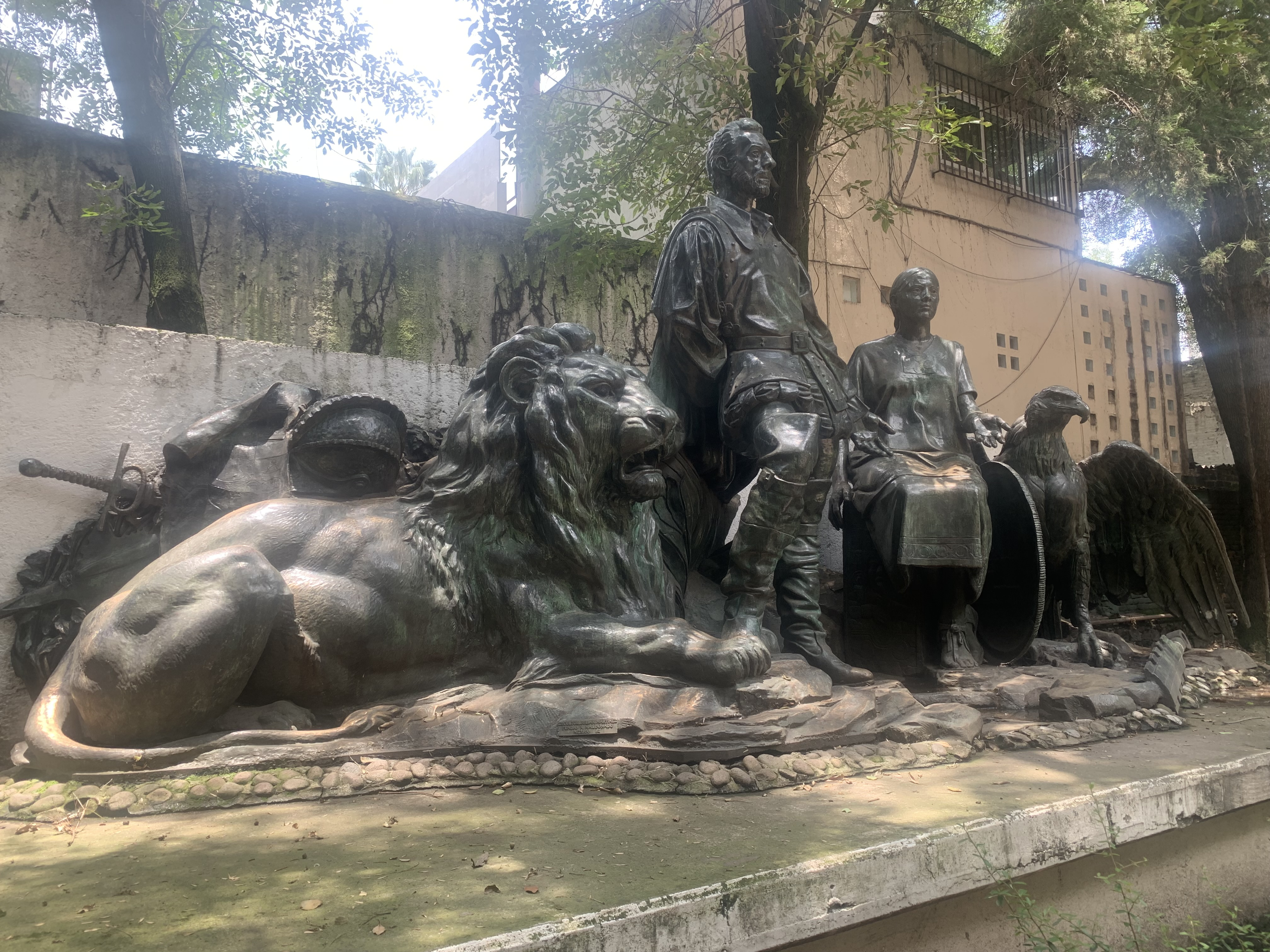

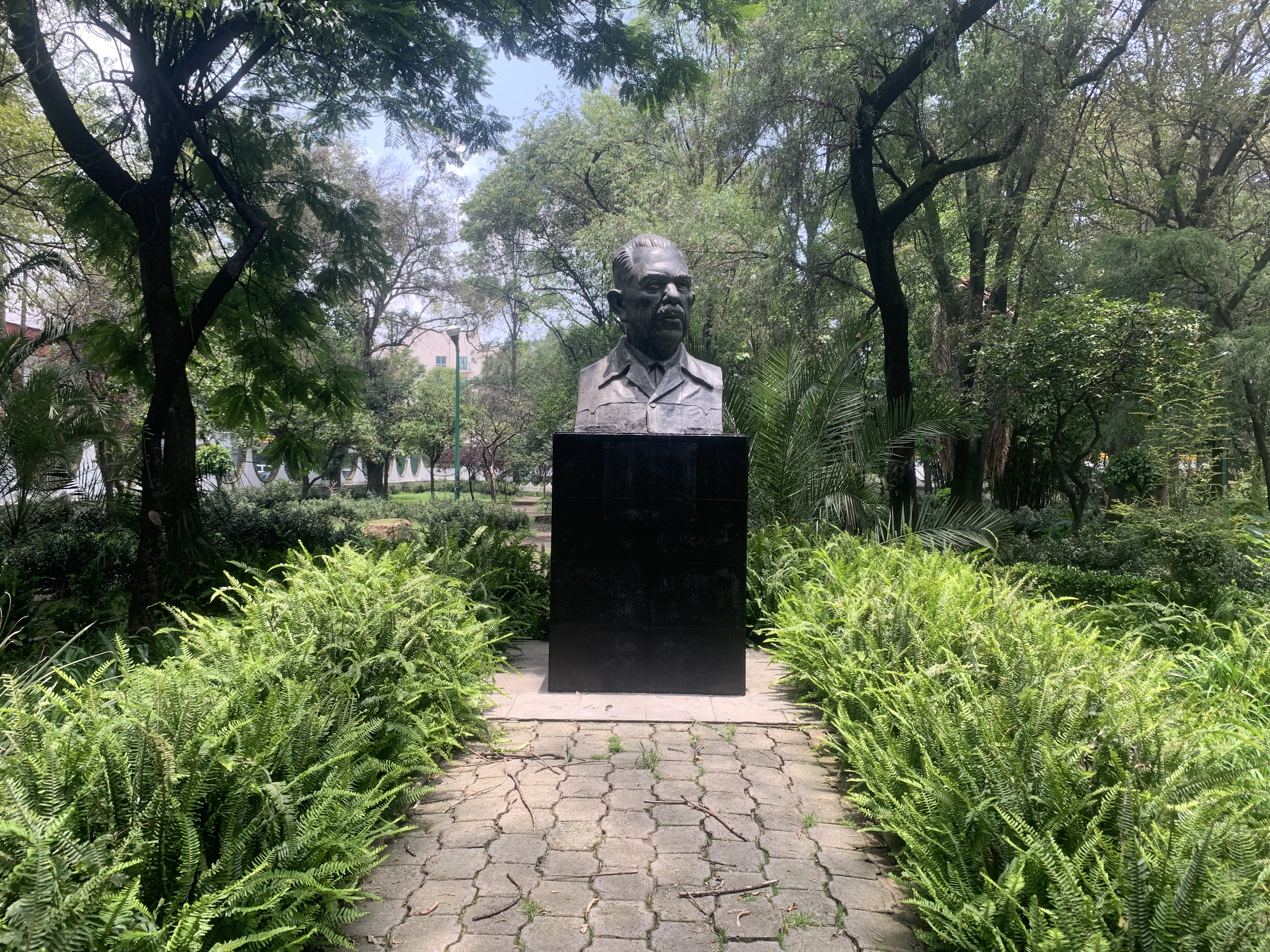

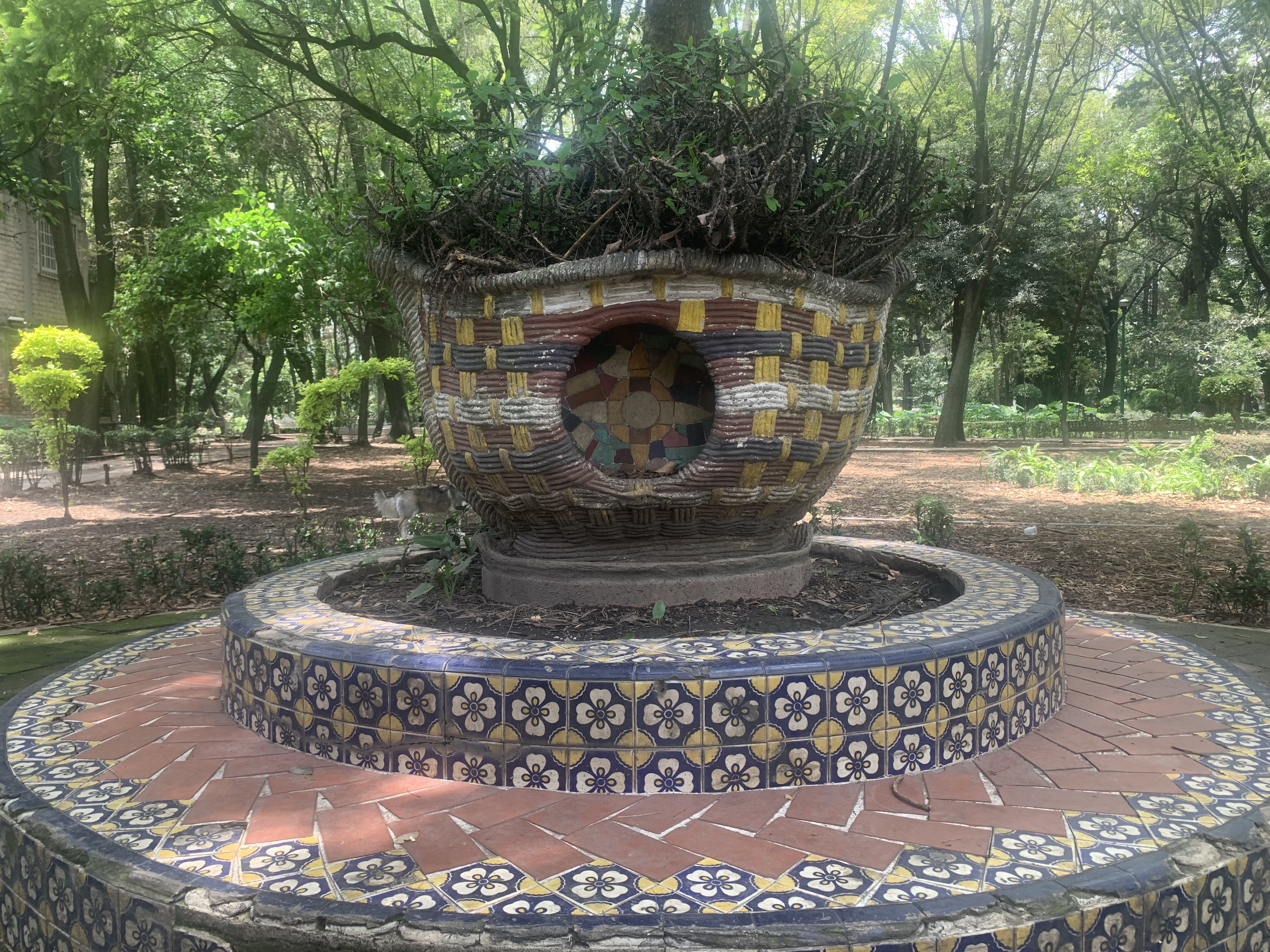

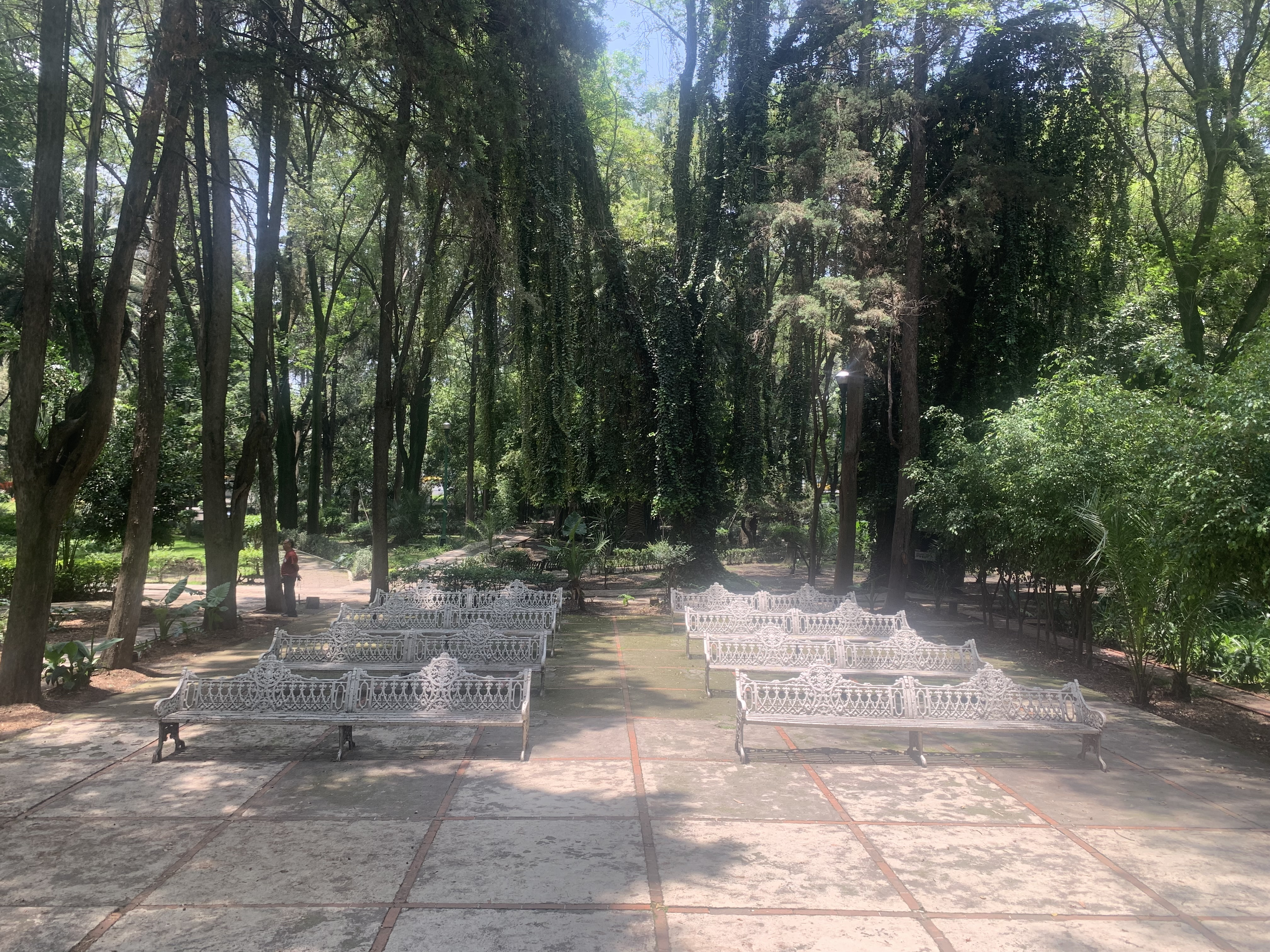

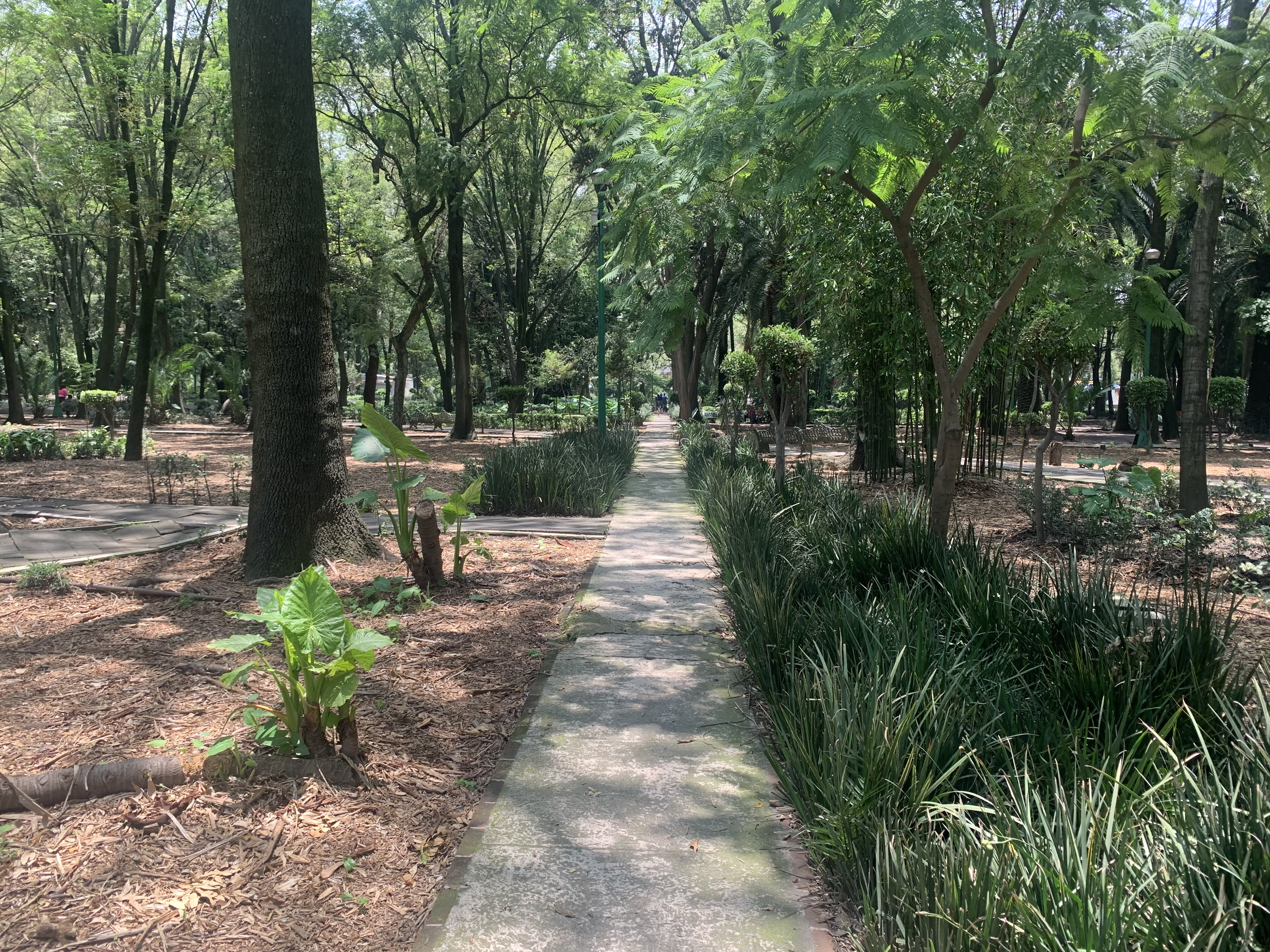

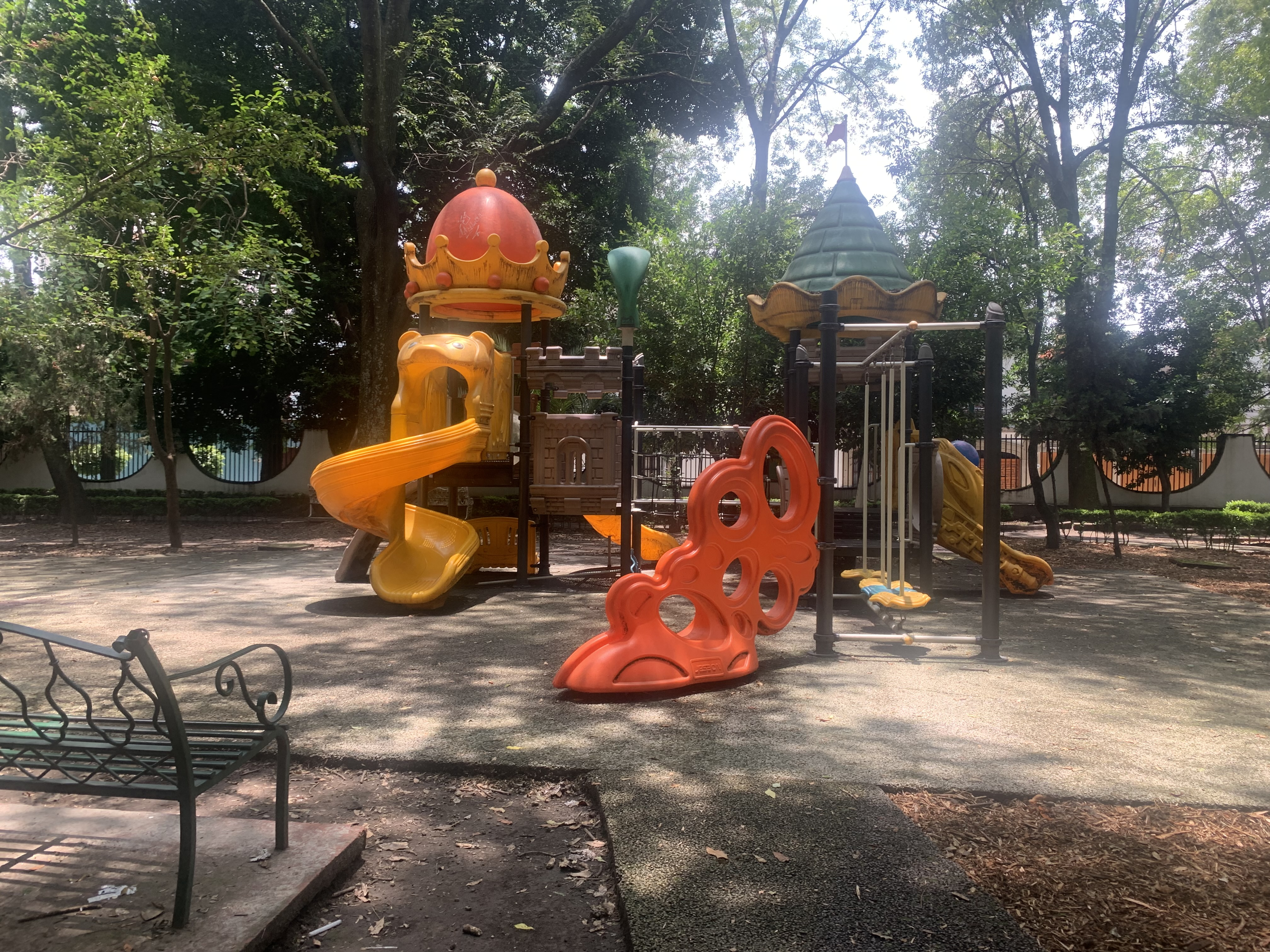

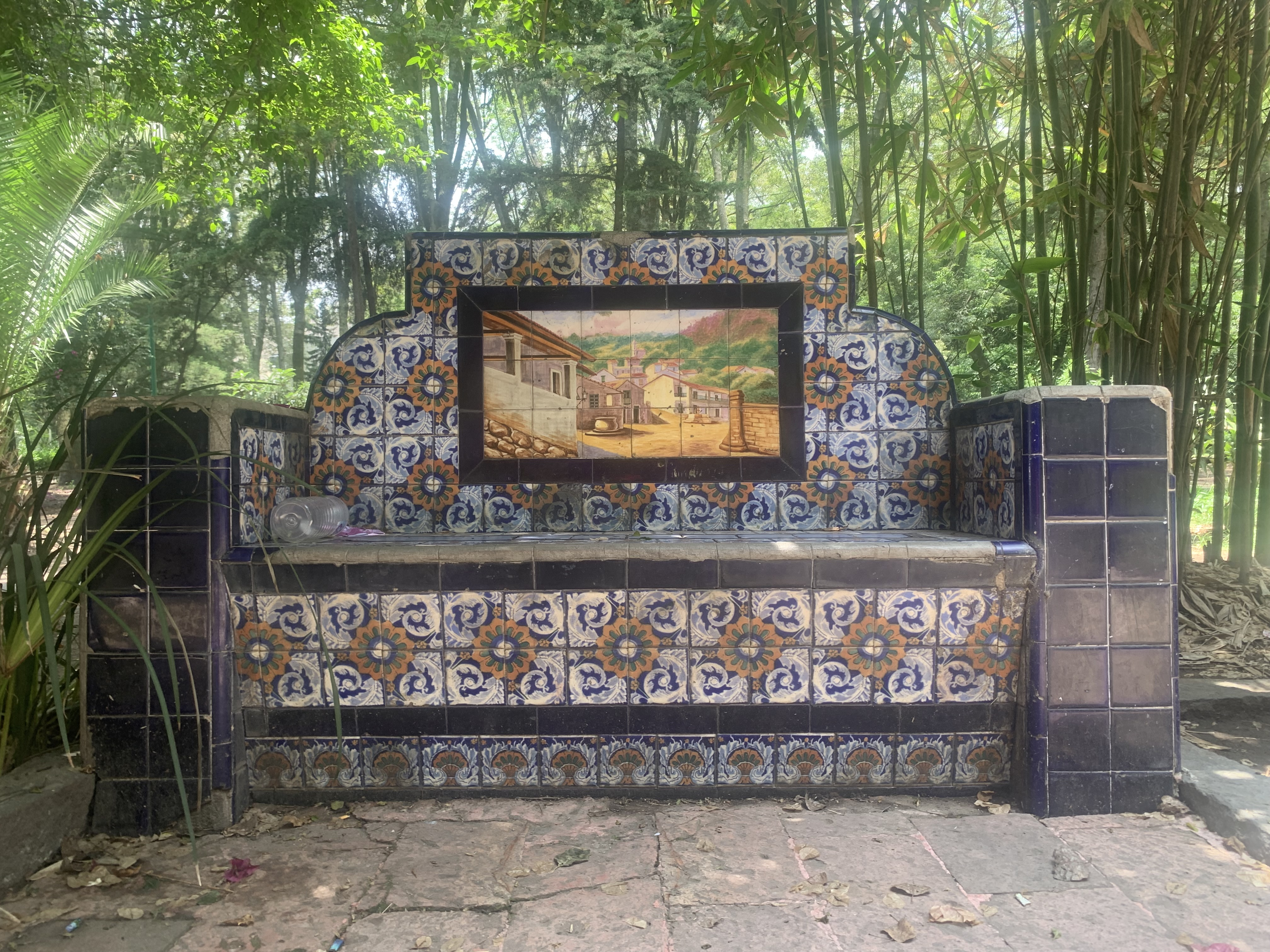

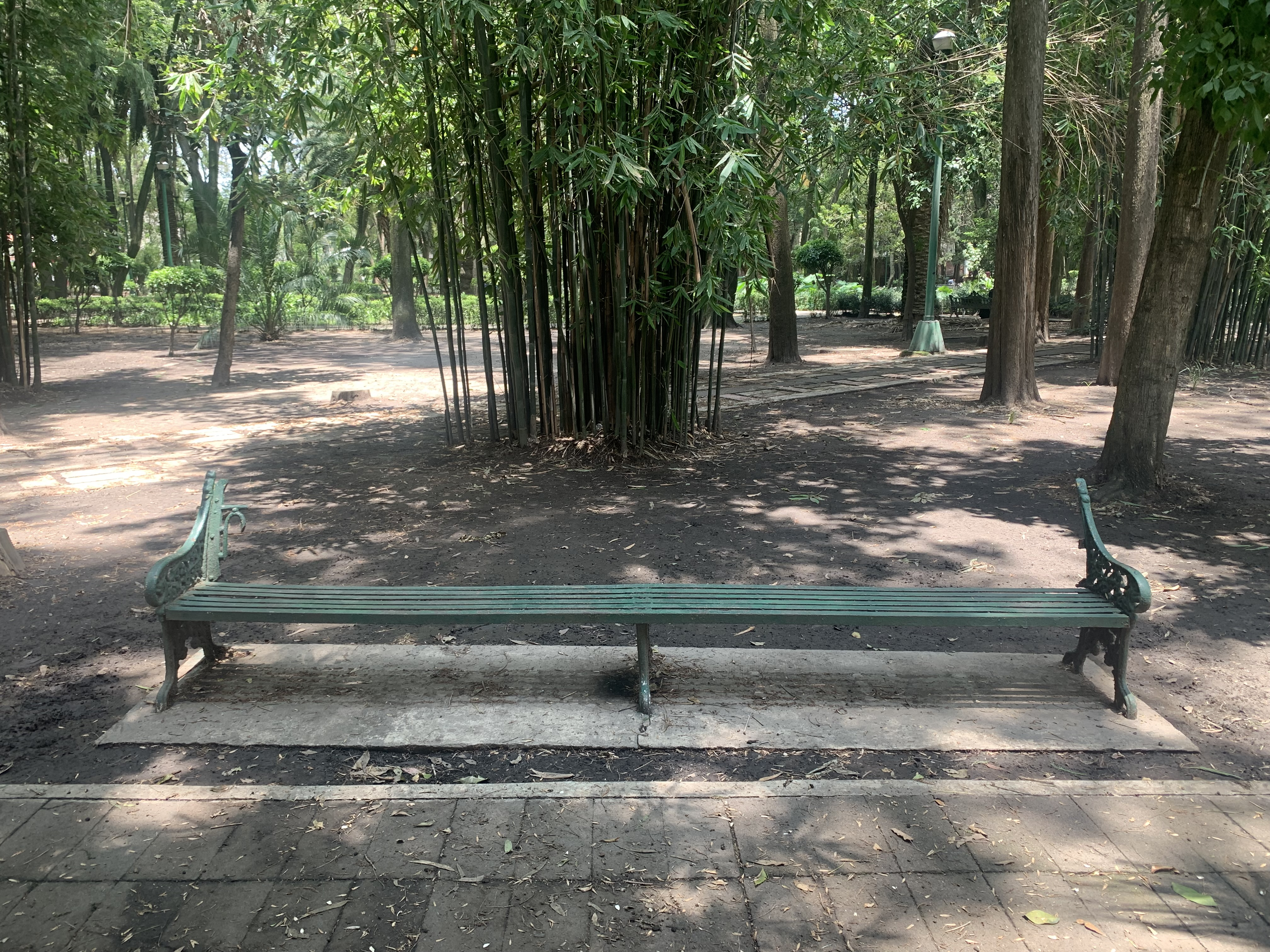

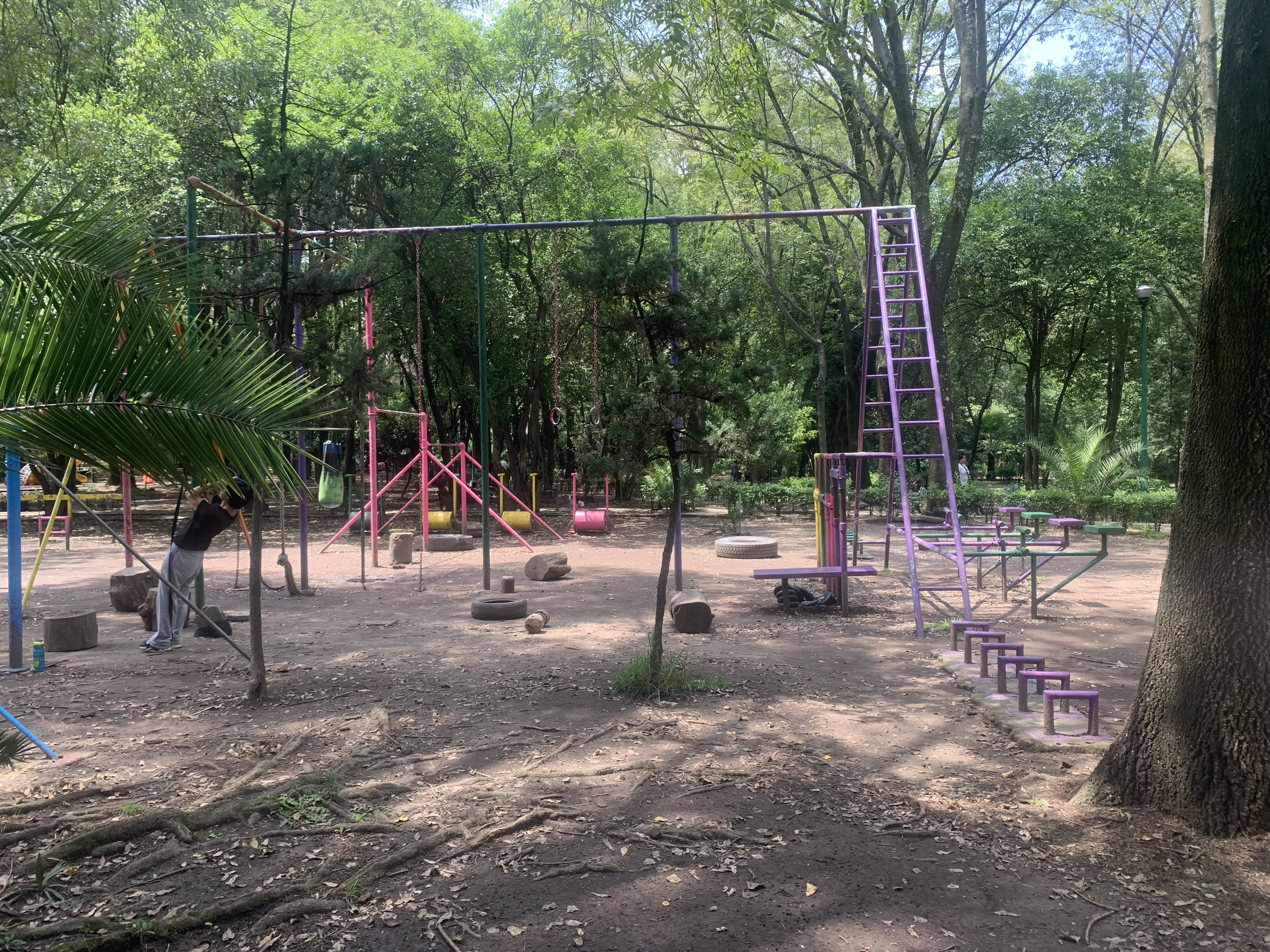

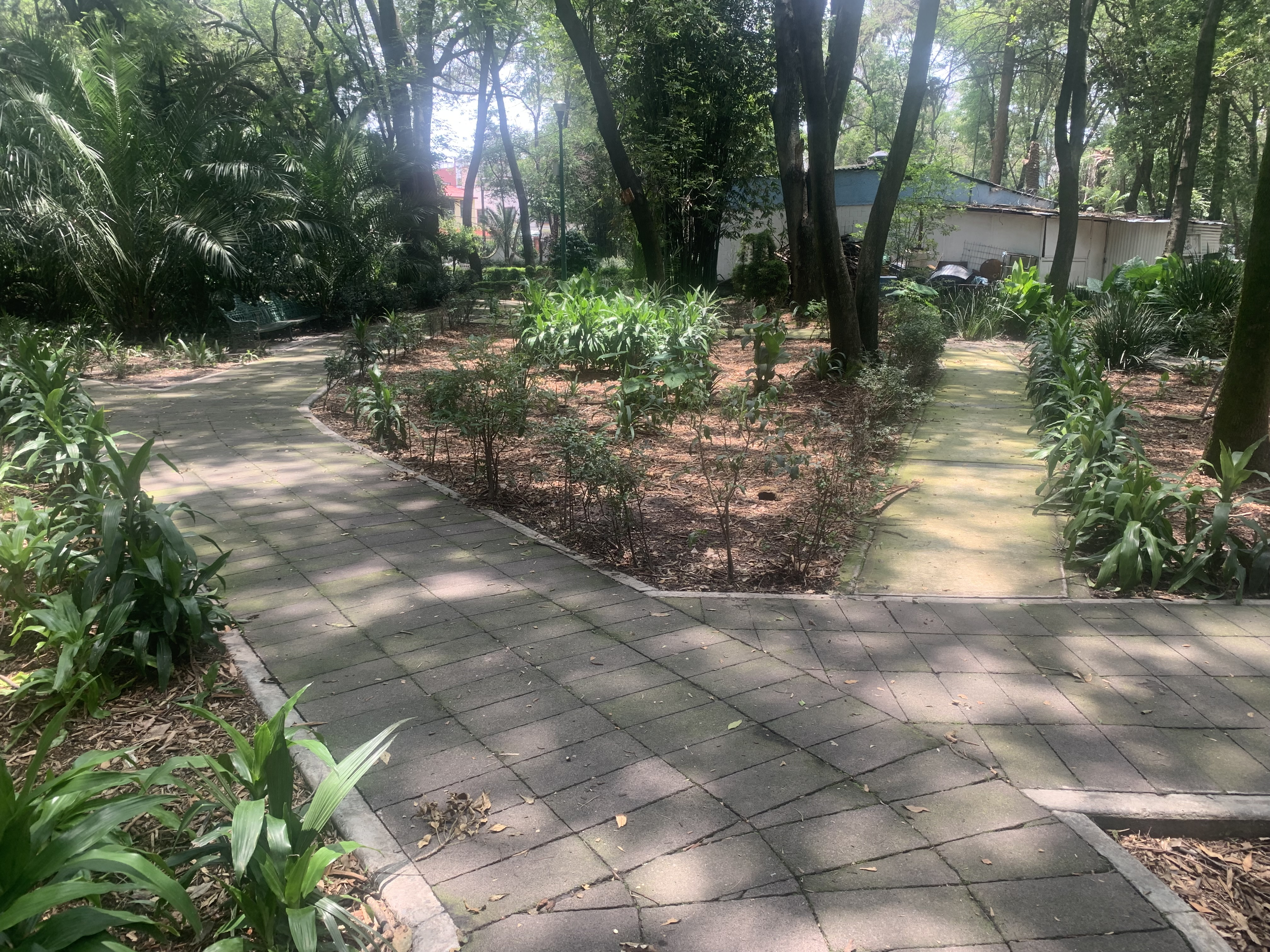

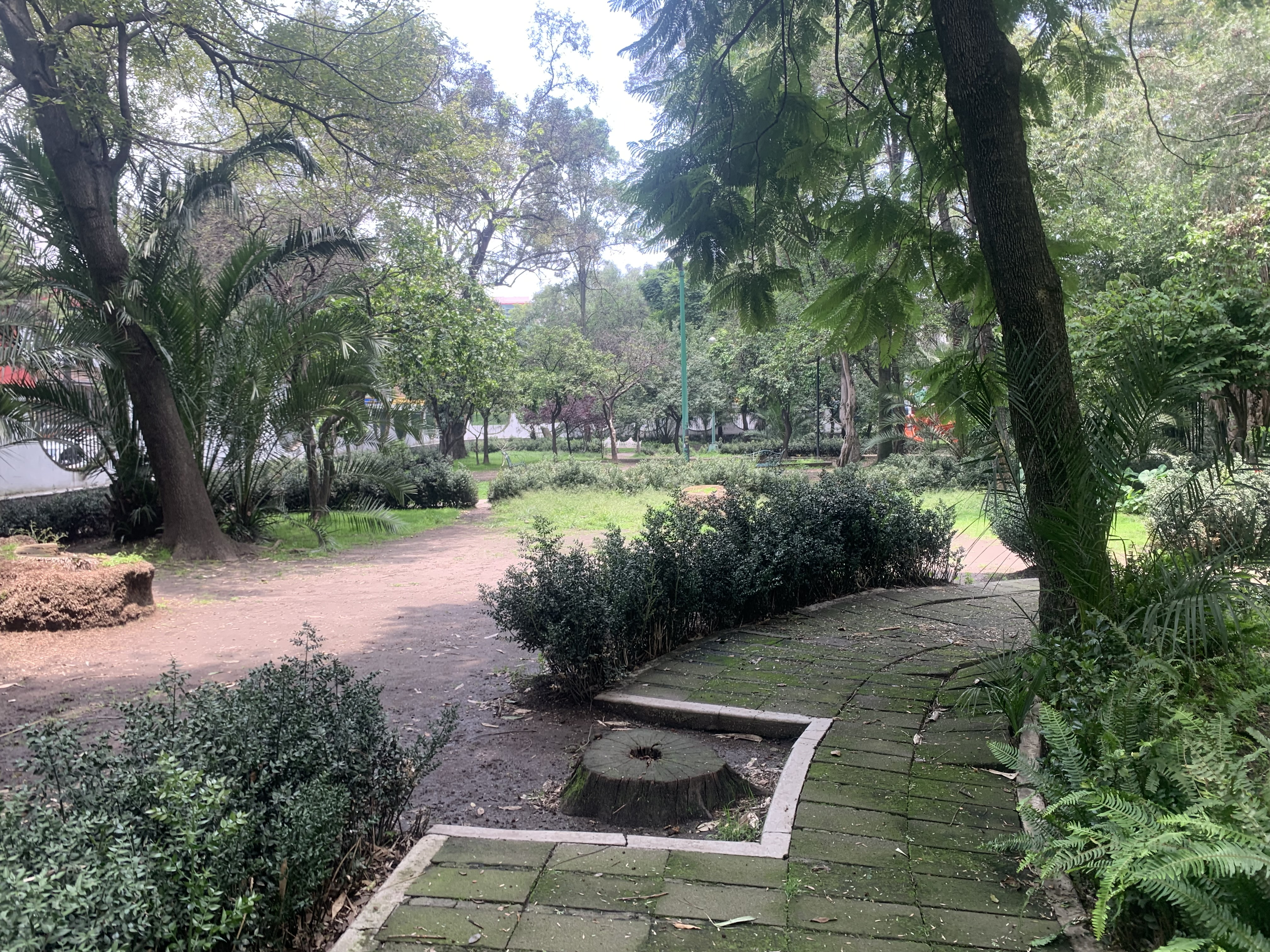

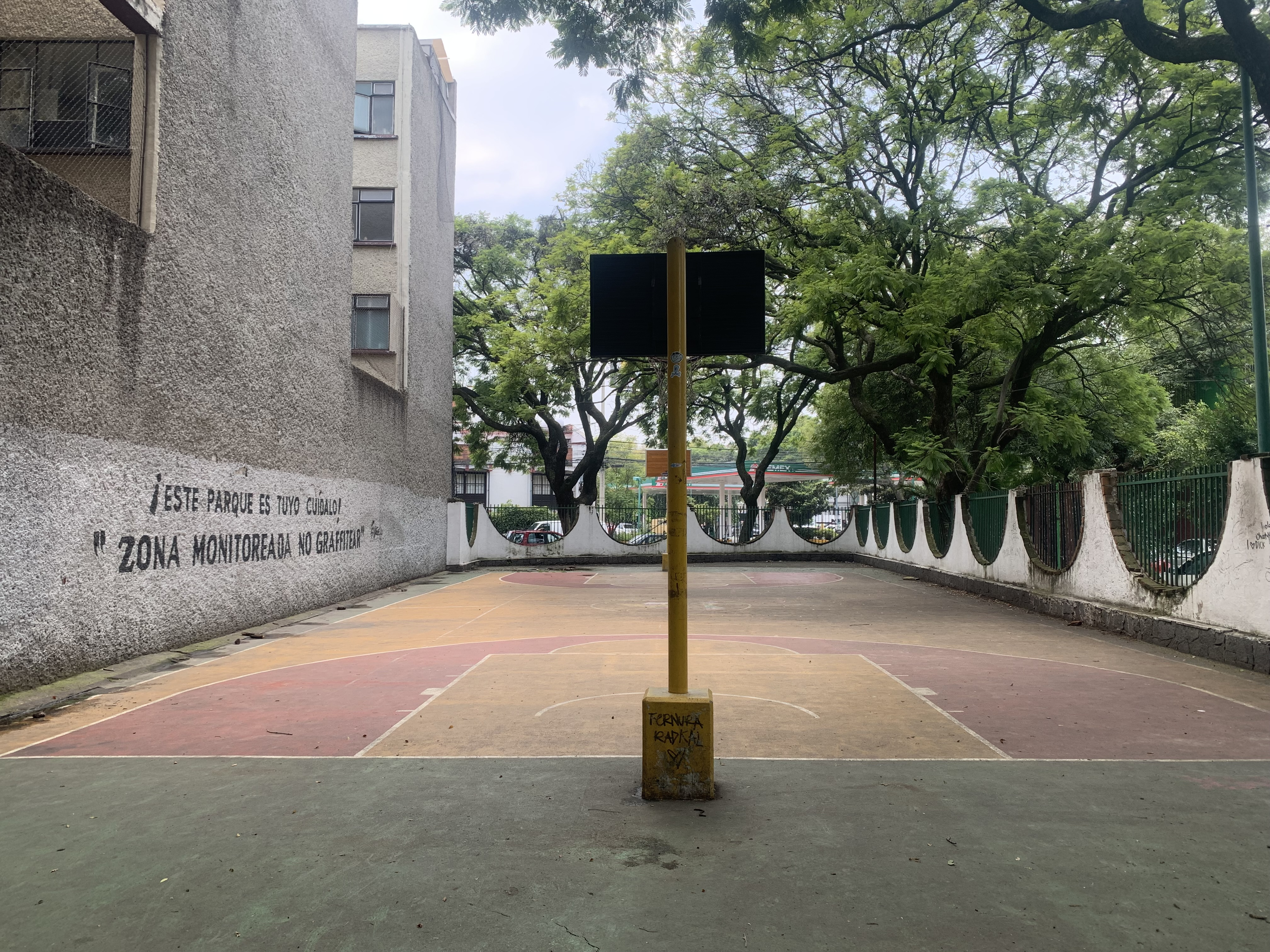

== See also ==
- List of public art in Mexico City
