= ARA Cabo San Antonio =

Tank landing ship in the Argentine Navy

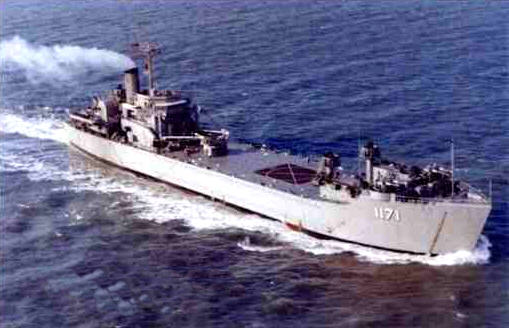
- The De Soto County class

History

Argentina
- Name: Cabo San Antonio
- Builder: AFNE, Río Santiago
- Launched: 20 July 1968
- Out of service: 1997

General characteristics
- Tonnage: 8000 tons
- Displacement: 3828 tons (light); 7804 tons (full load)
- Length: 442 ft (135 m)
- Beam: 62 ft (19 m)
- Draft: 10 ft (3.0 m) forward; 16 ft 8 in (5.08 m) aft (full load)
- Installed power: 13,700 bhp (10,200 kW)
- Propulsion: Six diesel engines, two shafts
- Speed: 16.9 knots (31.3 km/h; 19.4 mph) (max)
- Notes: Characteristics are assumed similar to USS De Soto County

ARA Cabo San Antonio (Q-42) was a tank landing ship in the Argentine Navy, built in Argentina at AFNE, Río Santiago shipyard. She was launched on 20 July 1968. Cabo San Antonio was based on the US Navy's De Soto County-class tank landing ship design.

== History ==
The high point of her career was the Argentine invasion of the Falkland Islands (Malvinas) in 1982, as part of Operation Azul. Cabo San Antonio disembarked with 20 LVTP-7 tracked amphibious armoured personnel carriers and LARC-V transports from the 1st Amphibious Vehicles Battalion, carrying D and E Companies of the 2nd Marine Infantry Battalion at Yorke Bay. She did not participate further in the Falklands War once the Argentinian landings finished.

Cabo San Antonio was decommissioned in 1997.

== Bibliography ==
- Scheina, Robert L. & Smigielski, Adam (1995). "Argentina". In Chumbley, Stephen (ed.). Conway's All the World's Fighting Ships, 1947–1995 (revised ed.). Naval Institute Press. pp. 3–12. ISBN 1-55750-132-7.

== See also ==
- List of ships of the Argentine Navy
