= Lisa C. Soto =

Contemporary American-Caribbean artist

Lisa C Soto
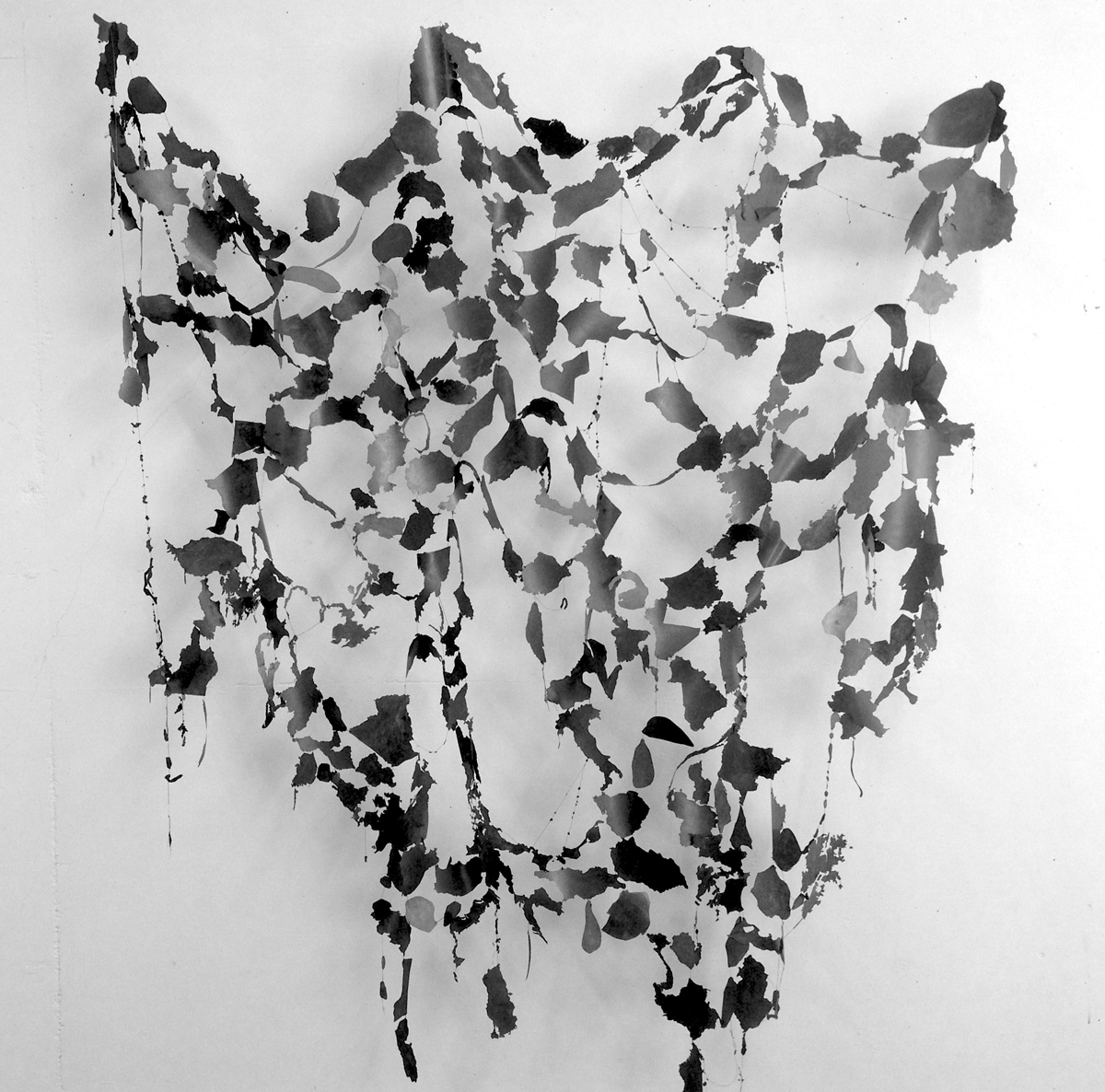
- Sculpture of Mylar, thread and graphite, 50" x 84", 2008
- Born: Los Angeles
- Website: http://www.lisacsoto.com/

Lisa C Soto is a visual artist based in Los Angeles, California. The themes of her work are informed by both "her Caribbean heritage and her continuous movements between continents and islands." Soto's drawings, installations and sculptures embody the struggle between connections and disconnections. Supporting the belief that all things, seen and unseen are essentially linked. There is a conversation that includes a personal and a universal situation, an interplay between the micro and the macro. Questioning the endless conflicts, the creation of artificial differences, and the establishment of borders. While exploring the essence of the forces at work in the macrocosm. Shaping what those energies, frequencies, and vibrations might look like.

== Early life and education ==
Soto was born in Los Angeles, California and grew up in New York City and a small, traditional village in the South of Spain, across the waters from Morocco. She received her art education at the [[Amsterdams Instituut voor Schilderkunst]], in the Netherlands. Her Caribbean heritage (Puerto Rican) and continuous movement to different continents and countries have impacted her art by giving her a wide range of perspectives and experiences.

== Work and Reception ==
Soto's work draws largely on industrial materials such as wire, bullet shells, Mylar, hardware, wire mesh, and mirrors. For example, Soto's "NGC1003 & NGC1913" consists of a pair of suspended planes made from crocheted squares of wire while her "The Gravity of Our Locus" is produced from subwoofers, copper wire, bullet shells and caps, and copper bowls. She transforms these materials into works suggestive of cartographic lines, neurons, swarms, nests, and webs. Of her work "Relational Realities," Jeannette Ehlers writes that these networks are so complex "so complex that it is almost impossible to trace the different lines across the grid." Soto states that her works relate "to systems of communications and universal principles in order to question society's conflicts and violence, while highlighting its harmonious network."

Reviewing the exhibition, "Soul Recordings," Luis de Jesus compares Soto's works to her fellow artists. De Jesus claims that Soto presents "subtle, nuanced objects and images, while remaining just as strongly tethered to a set of meanings and contexts no less fraught with hard truths."

Genie Davis has written that Soto's sculpture, "The Gravity of our Locus," which was presented at Los Angeles Contemporary Exhibitions. "is a stunning fountain of violence that is as lovely as a waterfall and as devastating as the deaths and injury the bullet shells and caps represent. The copper is burnished, shimmers almost like water; the bowls are shaped like artful lily pads, the symmetry is perfect. But above all else, this large-scale sculptural sound installation echoes with loss."

In his review of "Hard Edged," an exhibition at the California African American Museum, Christopher Knight offers a description of Soto's work "NGC1003 & NGC1913." The work consists of a pair of suspended planes made from crocheted squares of wire, which are attached to a small motor hidden near the ceiling. Knight writes that "The motor makes the layered, floating quilts slightly jostle and shimmy, their animation evoking a living spirit — the spirit of historical family legacies that quilts so often embody."

== Exhibitions ==
Soto has participated in solo and group exhibitions in the Dominican Republic, Spain, Miami, New York, New Orleans, Berlin and Los Angeles. She has participated "in residencies, public art shows and received commissions in the U.S., Europe and the Caribbean"

- "Names Printed in Black", Lace Gallery, Los Angeles, CA (2018)
- " "Relational Undercurrents: Contemporary Art of the Caribbean Archipelago, Pacific Standard Time Los Angeles/Latin America," Museum of Latin American Art, Long Beach, CA (2017)
- "Material as Metaphor," Craft and Folk Art Museum, Los Angeles, CA (2017)
- "Perfect Day," Roberts & Tilton Gallery, Los Angeles, CA (2016)
- Hermitage Artist Retreat, Sarasota, Florida (2016)
- “Hard Edged”, California African American Museum, Los Angeles, CA (2015)
- "Mi Tormenta", Tub Gallery Miami, Miami, FL (2014)
- “S,M,L,X:LA”, Museum of Architecture & Design, Los Angeles, CA (2014)
- “From voyeurism to wisdom”, Gallery 825, Los Angeles, CA (2014)
- “NEWSFEED: Anonymity & Social Media in African Revolutions and Beyond.” MoCADA Museum, Brooklyn, NY (2012)
- "Boomerang”, Perm Museum of Contemporary Art, Perm, Russia
- “Grenzenlos.Vielfältig.eins”, Berlin Art Projects, Berlin, Germany (2010)
- Quadriga prize, Berlin, Germany (2009)

== Videos and further reading ==
•Interview: Palacio Magazine

•Interview: Museum of Non Visible Art

•Interview: The Conversation Pod Lisa C Soto shares details about her culture, travel, her art and more with Michael Shaw.

•U.S. LATINX ARTS FUTURES SYMPOSIUM 2016 - Lisa C Soto speaking at symposium created and led by the artist Teresita Fernandez hosted at the Ford Foundation.

•The Making of "NGC 1003 & NGC 0913" - Lisa C Soto 2016 Video of crocheted wire installation in "Hard Edged" at California African American Museum (CAAM).

•"Minister of Power" - Lisa C Soto 2015 Video of hanging sculpture at Tub Gallery, Miami, Florida. Solo show "Mi Tormenta".

•"Interstellar, Gravitational, Subaquatic, Coral Dwellings" - Lisa C Soto 2014 Video of installation in Freeway Studies #2: Inside the Quad

•“From Voyeurism to Wisdom” - Lisa C Soto 2014 Video of installation shown at Gallery 825, Los Angeles Art Association.

•"Relational Realities" - Lisa C Soto 2014 Video of corner installation shown at group show "In 2040" at Jaus Gallery.

•“LCDC 20414” - Lisa C Soto 2014 Video of moving installation at Tub Gallery, Miami, Florida. Solo show "Mi Tormenta".

•"Ossified Cosmos" - Lisa C Soto 2014 Video of sculpture piece shown at Tub Gallery, Miami, Florida.

•"Equalizing Extremes" - Lisa C Soto 2012 Video by Eric Minh Swenson of Lisa C Soto working in her studio.
