= Santuyano (Mieres) =

- Parish

- Location within Spain
- Country: Spain
- Autonomous community: Asturias
- Province: Asturias
- Municipality: Mieres

Santuyano is one of 15 parishes (administrative divisions) in Mieres, a municipality within the province and autonomous community of Asturias, in northern Spain.

== Villages ==
- Brañanoceo
- La Cantera
- La Estación
- La Reguerona
- La Pedrera
- La Sierra
- La Venta
- Los Cuarteles del Maragatu
- Santuyano
- Villareo
- Villasola
- Vistalegre
