= Santuyanu (Les Regueres) =

Parish in Les Regueres, Asturias, Spain

Coordinates: 43.416667°N 5.966667°W

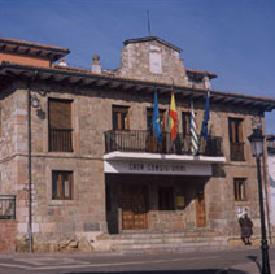
The municipal hall of Las Regueras, located in Santullano.

Santuyanu (Spanish: Santullano) is one of six parishes (administrative divisions) in Les Regueres, a municipality within the province and autonomous community of Asturias, in northern Spain.

The population is 358 (INE 2015).

== Villages ==
- Andayón
- Ania
- Llazana
- Oteru
- Santuyanu (capital)
- Trescañeu
- Viau
