= USS De Soto County =

1957 De Soto County-class tank landing ship

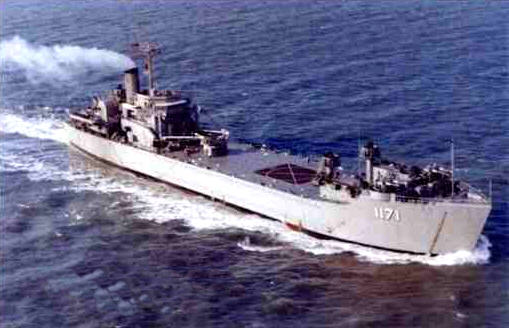
- USS De Soto County (LST-1171) underway in the Caribbean, circa 1958

History

United States
- Name: USS De Soto County
- Namesake: De Soto County
- Builder: Avondale Marine Ways, Inc. Avondale, Louisiana
- Laid down: September 1956
- Launched: 28 February 1957
- Commissioned: 10 June 1958
- Decommissioned: 17 July 1972
- Stricken: 8 May 1992
- Honours and awards: Meritorious Unit Commendation; 1 battle star (Vietnam)
- Fate: Loaned to the Italian Navy, 1972

Italy
- Name: Grado (L 9890)
- Acquired: 1972
- Fate: Sold for scrapping, 1989

General characteristics
- Class & type: De Soto County-class tank landing ship
- Displacement: 3,560 long tons (3,617 t) light; 7,823 long tons (7,949 t) full load
- Length: 445 ft (136 m)
- Beam: 62 ft (19 m)
- Draft: 16 ft 8 in (5.08 m)
- Propulsion: 6 × Fairbanks-Morse diesel engines, two shafts, fixed pitch propellers
- Speed: 17.5 knots (32.4 km/h; 20.1 mph)
- Boats & landing craft carried: 3 LCVPs and 1 Captain's Gig
- Capacity: 28 medium tanks or vehicles to 75 tons on 288 ft (88 m) tank deck; 100,000 gal (US) diesel or jet fuel, plus 7,000 gal fuel for embarked vehicles
- Troops: 575 officers and enlisted men
- Complement: 10 officers and 162 enlisted men
- Armament: 3 × 3 in (76 mm)/50 Mark 22 caliber gun mounts

USS De Soto County (LST-1171) was a De Soto County-class tank landing ship built for the United States Navy during the late 1950s. The lead ship of her class of seven, she was named after counties in Florida, Louisiana, and Mississippi, the only U.S. Naval vessel to bear the name.

De Soto County was designed under project SCB 119 and laid down 15 September 1956 at Avondale, Louisiana by Avondale Marine Ways, Inc.; launched on 28 February 1957; sponsored by Mrs. C. Horton Smith; and commissioned on 10 June 1958.

== Service history ==
For almost the entire length of her active service, De Soto County was assigned to the Amphibious Force, Atlantic Fleet. She interspersed operations off the east coast of the United States with frequent deployments to the Caribbean and the Mediterranean. The De Soto County was also used by the Navy for a PR deployment to the Great Lakes in 1964. Many dignitaries were shown aboard, including Admiral John McCain. The tank landing ship saw brief service in the Vietnam theater of operations in 1969.

=== Grado (L 9890) ===
Decommissioned on 17 July 1972, De Soto County was transferred to the Italian Navy where she served as Grado (L 9890). Struck from the Naval Vessel Register 8 May 1992, the ship was sold for scrapping by the Italian government in 1989.

De Soto County earned one Meritorious Unit Commendation for service with the 6th Fleet in the Mediterranean and one battle star for Vietnam War service.

== See also ==
- DeSoto County, Florida
- De Soto Parish, Louisiana
- DeSoto County, Mississippi
- ARA Cabo San Antonio (Q42) (DeSoto County-class based design for the Argentine Navy)
