= Julián Martínez Soto =

Spanish-born Mexican sculptor (1921–2000)

- Born: 1921; Valencia, Spain
- Died: May 23, 2000 (aged 78–79); Mexico City, Mexico
- Other names: Julian Martinez; Julián Martínez Soros; Julian Martinez–Sotos
- Education: Academy of San Carlos
- Occupations: Sculptor, painter

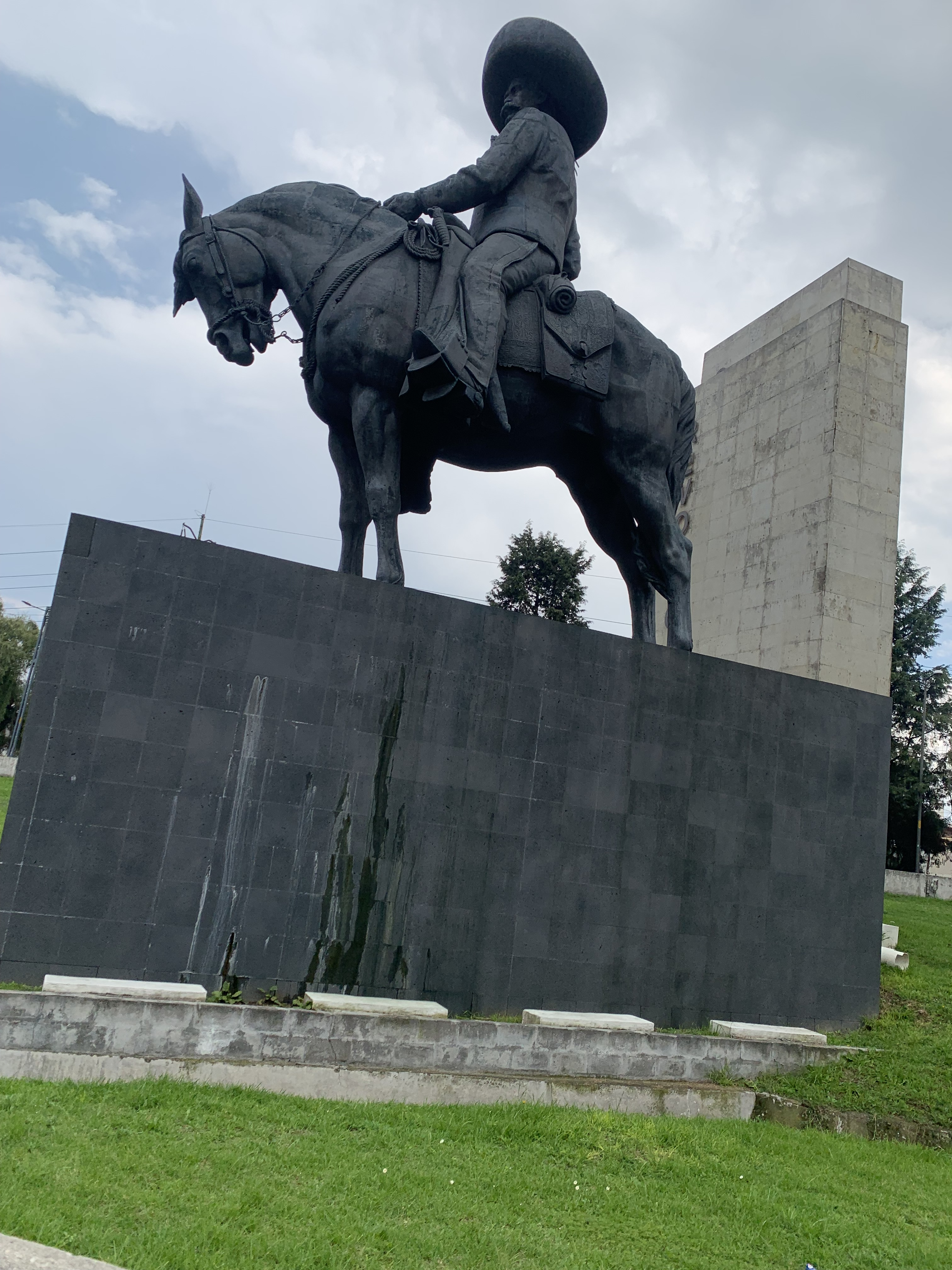
Equestrian statue of Emiliano Zapata, on Paseo Tollocan, entrance to Toluca, State of Mexico

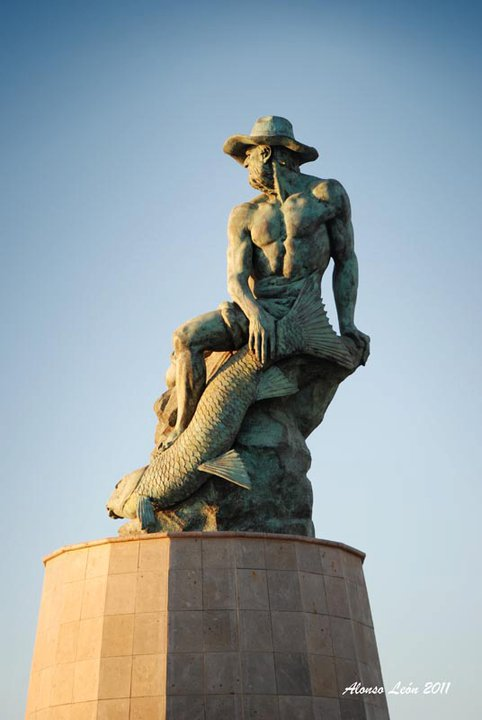
The Fisherman, Guaymas, Sonora

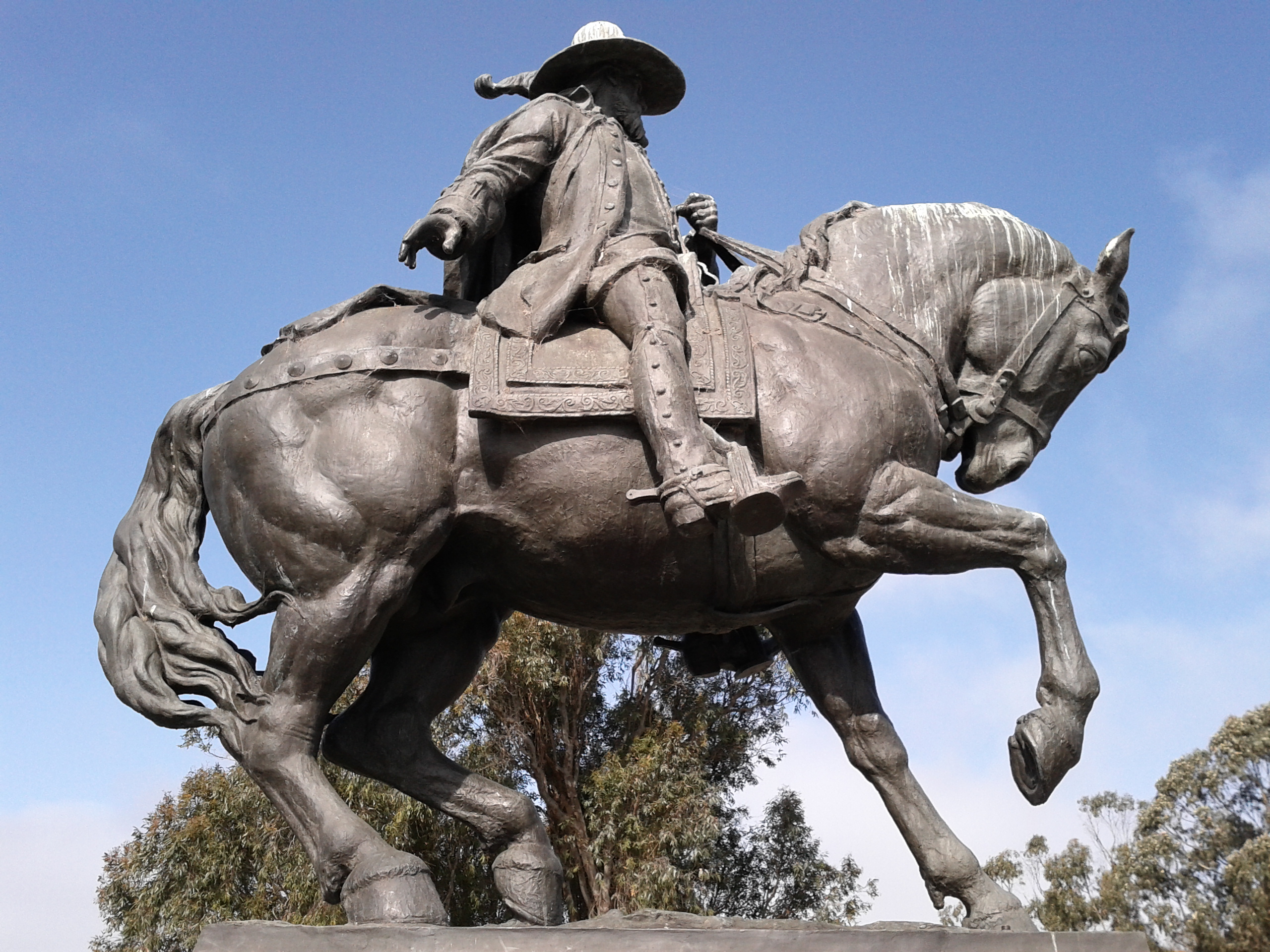
Statue of Juan Bautista De Anza (1967) San Francisco, California

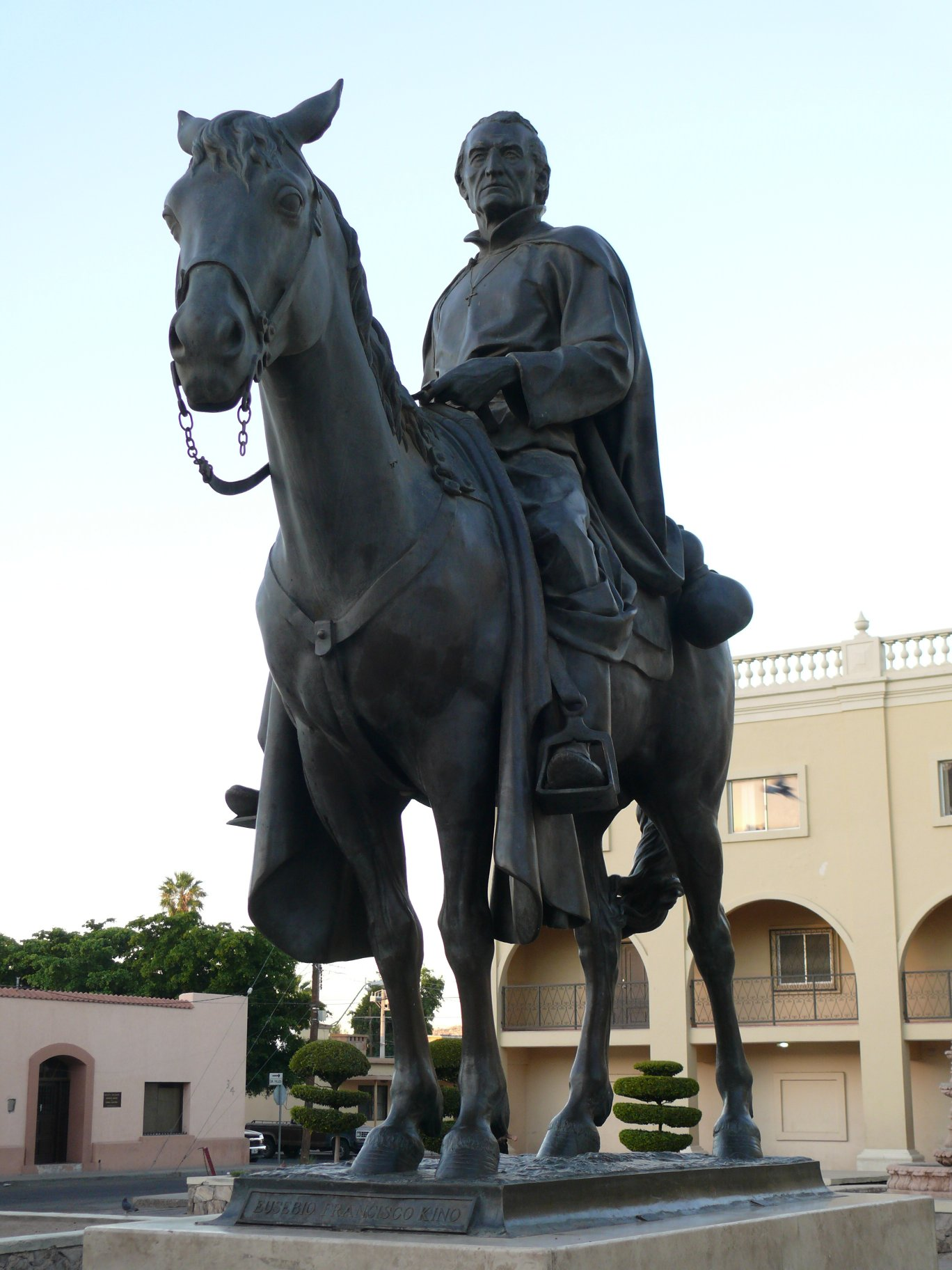
Statue of Father Eusebio Francisco Kino (1989), Magdalena de Kino, Sonora

Julián Martínez Soto (1921 – May 23, 2000), was a Spanish-born Mexican sculptor and painter. He created more than 200 sculptures in Spain, Italy, Mexico, and the United States. Soto left Spain and arrived in Mexico in June 1937 with the Niños de Morelia (English: Children of Morelia), a group of children of Spanish Republicans, intending to visit while the Spanish Civil War was ending. His family name is sometimes written as Soros, or Sotos due to journalistic and bibliographic errors.

== Life and career ==
Julián Martínez Soto was born in 1921, in Valencia, Spain. He was the son of a Republican teacher. In his early childhood he enjoyed painting. He left Spain and arrived in Mexico on June 7, 1937, with the Niños de Morelia (English: Children of Morelia), a group of children of Spanish Republicans who came to Mexico to spend a "school vacation", or "school camp", while the Spanish Civil War was ending. The Children of Morelia were never officially recognized as exiles, instead, they were named "adopted children of the people of Mexico." He was 16 years old when he arrived. Soto received asylum from President Lázaro Cárdenas.

Soto attended the Mexico-Spain Industrial School (Spanish: Escuela Industrial México-España) in Morelia, Michoacán, Mexico; and studied art at the National School of Fine Arts (now Academy of San Carlos) in Mexico City.

He worked as a painter at the Estudios Churubusco movie studio in 1949. Soto created more than 200 sculptures; his most notable work is the statue of former President Lázaro Cárdenas del Río in Madrid, which he made as a token of gratitude to the Mexican leader who received the Children of Morelia. Soto's notable students included American sculptor John Sherrill Houser.

He died of a heart attack on May 23, 2000, in Mexico City.

== List of works ==
=== Mexico ===
==== Baja California ====
- Lázaro Cárdenas, Ensenada
- Monument to the Mother, Ensenada
- Benito Juárez, Mexicali

==== Mexico City ====
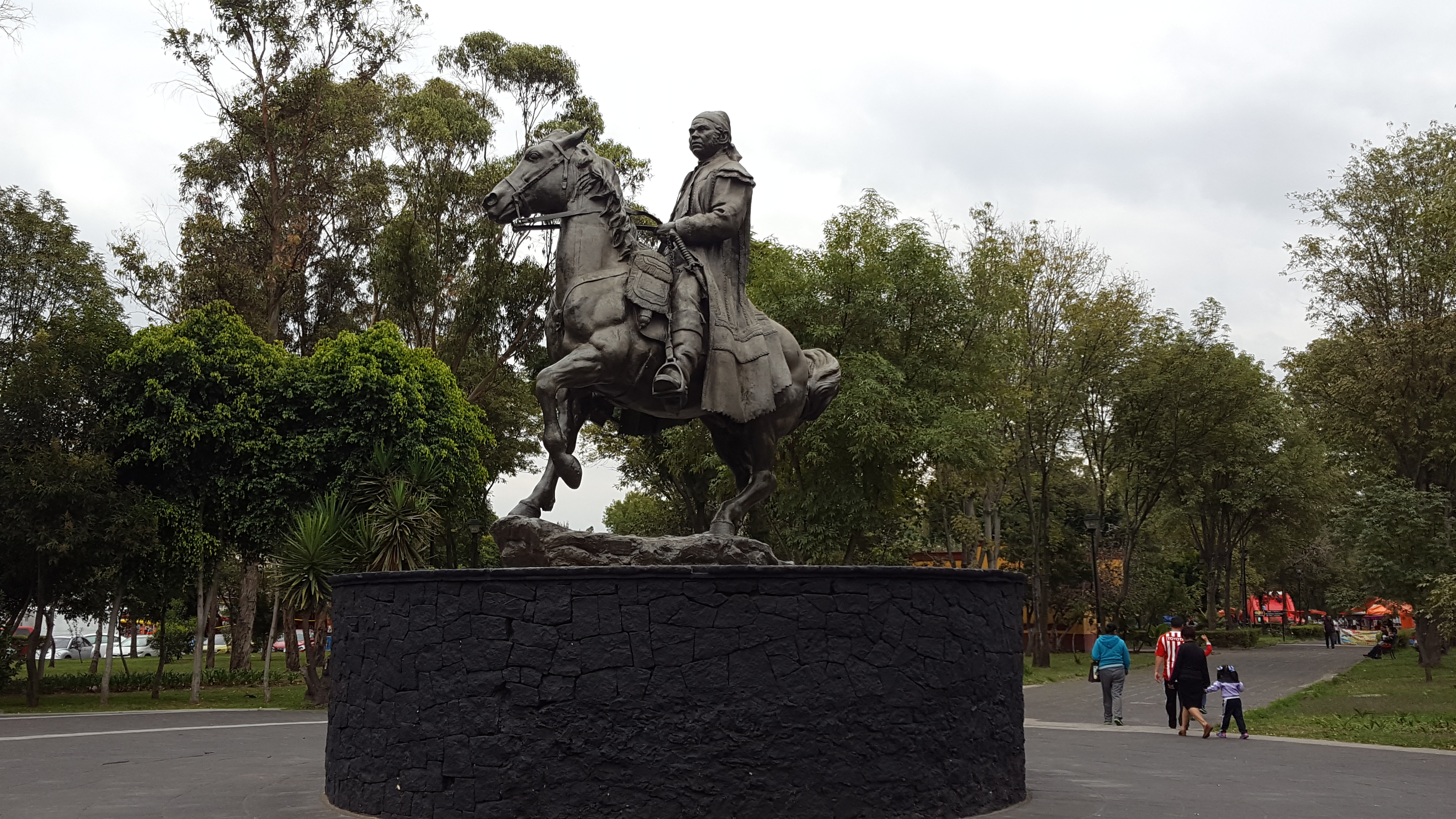
Equestrian statue of José María Morelos, Coyoacán, Mexico City

- Statue of León Felipe, (1973), Casa del Lago, Bosque de Chapultepec
- Monument to Mestizaje (1981) Parque Xicoténcatl, Coyoacán
- Equestrian statue of José María Morelos, Alameda del Sur, Coyoacán
- Equestrian statue of Pancho Villa, Parque de los Venados, Benito Juárez (formerly located on Avenida División del Norte, Mexico City)
- Don Pelayo, Parque Asturias
- Statue of Heberto Castillo, General Archive of the Nation

==== Sonora ====
- Statue of the Fisherman (1968), Guaymas
- Statue of Jesús García (1976), Hermosillo
- Statue of Father Eusebio Francisco Kino (1989), Magdalena de Kino
- Juan Navarrete Guerrero, Hermosillo
- José María Morelos, Boulevard Morelos, Hermosillo
- Bust of Luis Donaldo Colosio, Hermosillo
- Equestrian statue of Juan Bautista de Anza, Hermosillo
- Presidents of the Republic, Boulevard Rodríguez, Hermosillo (including Álvaro Obregón, Adolfo de la Huerta, Abelardo L. Rodríguez, Plutarco Elías Calles)
- Plaza of the Three Presidents, Guaymas (including Adolfo de la Huerta, Plutarco Elías Calles, Abelardo L. Rodríguez)
- The Fisherman, Guaymas
- Bust of Lázaro Cárdenas, Guaymas
- Statue dedicated to the Pioneers of Ciudad Obregón, Ciudad Obregón
- Statue of José María Leyva, Ciudad Obregón
- Bust of Luis Donaldo Colosio, Ciudad Obregón
- The Fisherman, Puerto Peñasco

==== State of Mexico ====
- Lázaro Cárdenas, Toluca
- Equestrian statue of Emiliano Zapata, Paseo Tollocan, entrance to Toluca

=== United States ===
==== Arizona ====
- Equestrian statue of Francisco Villa (1981), Tucson
- Father Eusebio Franciasco Kino (1988), Kino Parkway, Tucson

==== California ====
- Equestrian statue of Juan Bautista de Anza (1967), Lake Merced, San Francisco
- Statue of Martin Luther King Jr. (1981), 11 ft tall, San Bernardino City Hall, San Bernardino
- Equestrian statue of José María Morelos (1981), El Parque de México in Lincoln Park, Los Angeles
- Bust of John Fitzgerald Kennedy, University of California

=== Spain ===
- Bust of Lázaro Cárdenas, Córdoba
- Statue of Lázaro Cárdenas, Parque Norte, Madrid

=== Italy ===
- Statue of Father Eusebio Francisco Kino (1990), Segno, Liguria
