= Sotho =

Sotho may refer to:

- Sotho people (or Basotho), an African ethnic group principally resident in South Africa, Lesotho and southern Botswana
- Sotho language (Sesotho or Southern Sotho), a Bantu language spoken in southern Africa, an official language of both South Africa and Lesotho
- Northern Sotho language (Sesotho sa Leboa), a group of related Bantu dialects classed together as an official language of South Africa
- Sotho–Tswana languages, the S.30 language group, a linguistic classification which groups together the related languages Sotho, Northern Sotho, Tswana, and Lozi
- Sotho-Tswana peoples, a group of southern African ethnic groups with a common history, speakers of languages in the Sotho group
- Lesotho, a country in southern Africa entirely surrounded by South Africa
- Bosotho, a region in Limpopo province, also known as Sekhukhuneland, the home of the BaPedi people
