= Sotu =

Coordinates: 43.433333°N 5.983333°W

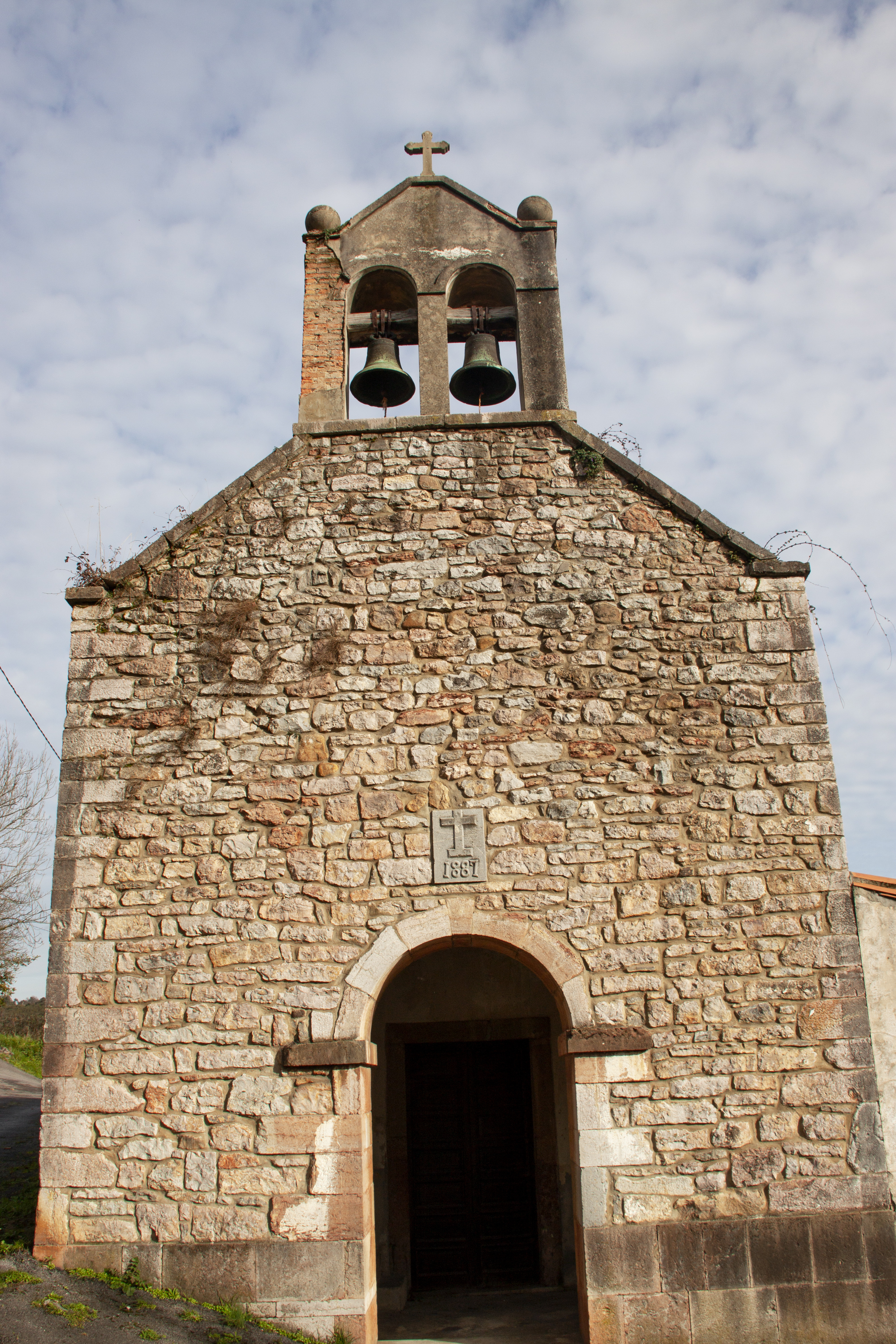
Sotu

Sotu (Spanish: Soto) is one of six parishes (administrative divisions) in Les Regueres, a municipality within the province and autonomous community of Asturias, in northern Spain.

The population is 138 (INE 2011).

== Villages ==
- Alcéu
- Pereda
- Sotu
