= John Sherrill Houser =

American painter and sculptor

Bronze equestrian statue of Juan de Oñate by John Sherrill Houser, El Paso International Airport, 2006

Medical Education Mural by John Sherrill Houser, 1967, Oregon Health & Science University

John Sherrill Houser (1935 – January 10, 2018) was an American painter and sculptor.

== Biography ==
He was born in Rapid City, South Dakota where his father, Ivan Houser, was assistant sculptor to Gutzon Borglum in the early years of carving Mount Rushmore; he began working with Borglum shortly after the inception of the monument and was with Borglum for a total of seven years. When Houser left Gutzon to devote his talents to his own work, Gutzon's son, Lincoln, took over as Assistant- sculptor to his father.

Encouraged in art from childhood, young Houser studied art at Lewis and Clark College (Portland, Oregon), the University of California and Art Center College of Design (Los Angeles, now Pasadena, California). Additionally he studied under Julián Martínez Soto.

He pursued two years of independent study in Europe as a recipient of the Elizabeth Greenshields Foundation Award during which time he also assisted the American sculptor, Avard Fairbanks, on an equestrian monument to the Pony Express and worked with classicist painter, R. H. Ives Gammell in Boston, Massachusetts.

In his career Houser has traveled extensively through Europe, Morocco, Mexico, Ecuador and the United States. Dedicating most of his adult life to interpreting the human condition through direct experience, he has lived and worked for extended periods among such diverse groups as the mountain people of Appalachia, the Gullah Blacks of South Carolina, The street fakirs (faquiri) of Rome, Italy, hippies of San Francisco's Haight-Ashbury (1960's), Mexican and Black migrant laborers, American gypsies and Native Americans including Taos Pueblo, the Tonto Apache, the Eastern Band of Cherokee, and the Yaqui and Tohono O'odham (Papago) tribes of Arizona. In Mexico the artist lived and worked among the Seri Indians on the coast of Sonora, Mexico, the Tarahumara Indians of the Copper Canyon, Chihuahua, Mexico, the Lacandón Indians (Chiapas, Mexico), and the Aschuar Indians (Jívaro) of the Upper Amazon in Ecuador.

In 1988, he conceived and proposed the XII Travelers Memorial of the Southwest (a sculpture walk through history) for the city of El Paso. This unfinished project commemorates the history of the Southwest in twelve monuments representing twelve different historical periods. The first monument, The Building of the Missions (Fray García) was completed in 1997, followed by The Spanish Settlement of the Southwest (Don Juan de Oñate, AKA The Equestrian) in 2007. Two other monuments in the series are now in progress, Benito Juárez, Zapotec Indian president of Mexico and Susan Shelby Magoffin, diarist of the Santa Fe Trail.

The artist's son, Ethan Taliesin Houser assisted his father on The Equestrian (AKA Don Juan de Oñate). This monument, 36-feet high, is purported to be the world's largest bronze equestrian statue. It was cast in Mexico City and installed in front of the El Paso International Airport on April 27, 2007. The Last Conquistador, an hour-long PBS documentary produced by John Valadez and Cristina Ibarra, featuring the artist and the controversy surrounding Don Juan de Oñate was shown nationally on POVTV, July 15, 2008. Houser's newest project is The Puchteca, (pre-Columbian trader), a 250-foot colossus designed to straddle the US/Mexico border. John's work is found in the U.S. Library of Congress (Washington, D.C.), the Southwest Museum (Los Angeles, California), the Greenshields Museum (Montreal, Canada) and the Forest Hills sculpture garden (Boston, Massachusetts), among others.

Houser modeled a clay study of 1962 Nobel Prize-winning scientist Francis Crick a few years before his death, and it has now been cast in bronze; the bust was intended for American and British institutions associated with Crick. The bronze was displayed at the Francis Crick Memorial Conference (on Consciousness) at the University of Cambridge's Churchill College on July 7, 2012. The bronze bust was bought by Mill Hill School, London, Crick's former school in May 2013 and displayed at their inaugural Crick Dinner on June 8, 2013; it was viewed for the first time by his daughter Gabrielle, and grandson Mark Nichols, a son of Christopher and the late Jacqueline Nichols, née Crick. It was very well received by all of those present, some of whom had contributed towards its purchase by the Mill Hill School Foundation community. He died on January 10 2018 at age 82-83.

== Professional affiliations ==
John Houser maintained his studio in Santa Fe, New Mexico. He was a Professional member of the National Sculpture Society and the American National Portrait Society.

== Bibliography ==
- Houser, Nicholas, The Conquistador, The world of Spanish Horses, Vol. 9, Number 5, Creating the World's Largest Horse.
- Tucson Art Center, The West, Artists and Illustrators, Tucson, Arizona, Tucson Art Center, 1972.
