= Iglesia de la Santa Cruz =

Iglesia de la Santa Cruz may refer to:

- Iglesia de la Santa Cruz (Cangas de Onís), Asturias, Spain
- Iglesia de la Santa Cruz (Inguanzo), Asturias, Spain
- Iglesia de la Santa Cruz (Puerto Vallarta), Jalisco, Mexico
- La Iglesia de Santa Cruz and Site of the Plaza of Santa Cruz de la Canada, Espanola, New Mexico
