= Zona Romántica =

Neighborhood of Puerto Vallarta, Jalisco, Mexico

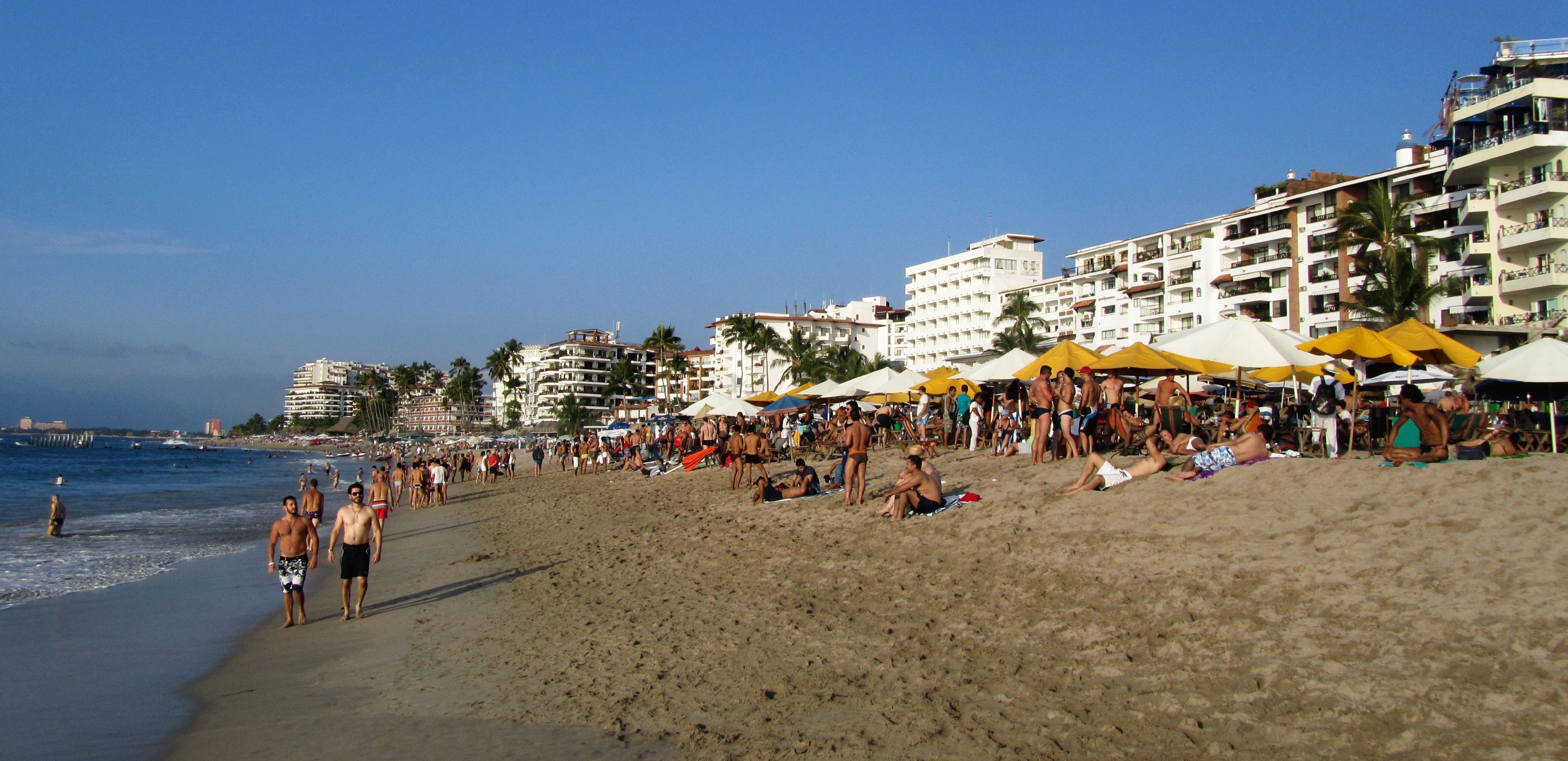
- Playa de los Muertos, 2011

- Location within Mexico
- Coordinates: 20.603748°N 105.235608°W
- Country: Mexico

Zona Romántica is the unofficial designation for an LGBTQ-friendly tourist area in southern Puerto Vallarta, in the Mexican state of Jalisco. The zone is made of three colonias: Emiliano Zapata, Alta Vista, and Amapas. The area is also commonly referred to as Old Town.

== Features ==
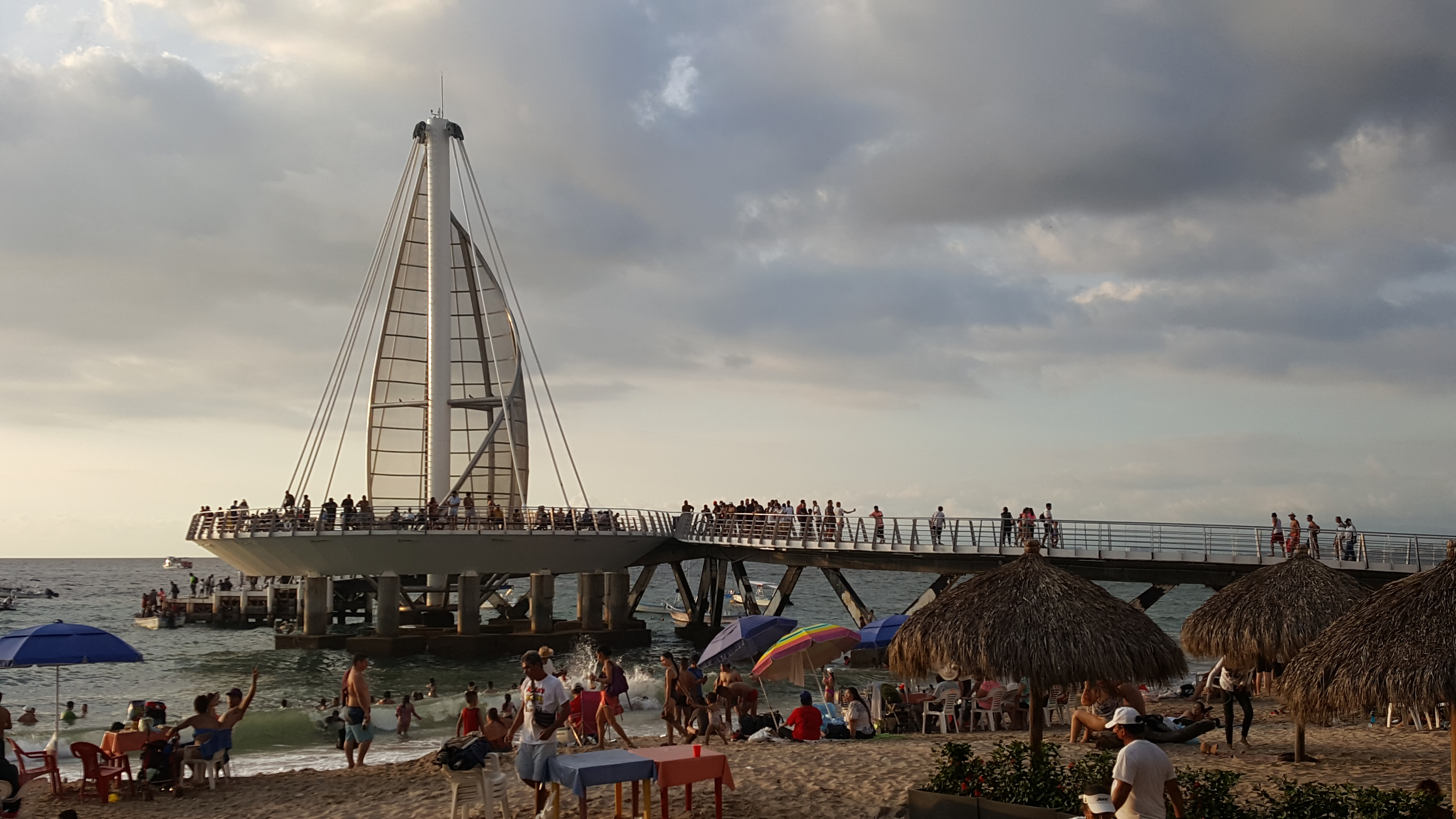
Los Muertos Pier

The Malecón spans Centro and Zona Romántica. Beaches within Zona Romántica include Playa de los Muertos featuring Los Muertos Pier, Playa Olas Altas, and the smaller Las Amapas Beach.

Notable buildings include Iglesia de la Santa Cruz. Notable restaurants include Andale's Restaurant & Bar, Archie's Wok, Le Bistro, The Blue Shrimp, Coco's Kitchen, El Dorado, Fredy's Tucan, Kaiser Maximilian, La Palapa, The Pancake House, Pancho's Takos, River Cafe, and Tintoque.

Public art in the district include Ándale Bernardo by Jim Demetro and a statue of Lázaro Cárdenas in Lázaro Cárdenas Park, as well as The Fisherman (1996) by Ramiz Barquet, The Fishermen (2018) by Jim and Christina Demetro, and The Washer Woman by Jim Demetro. Isla Cuale features Identidad (2019) and a statue of John Huston, installed in 1988.

=== LGBT culture ===
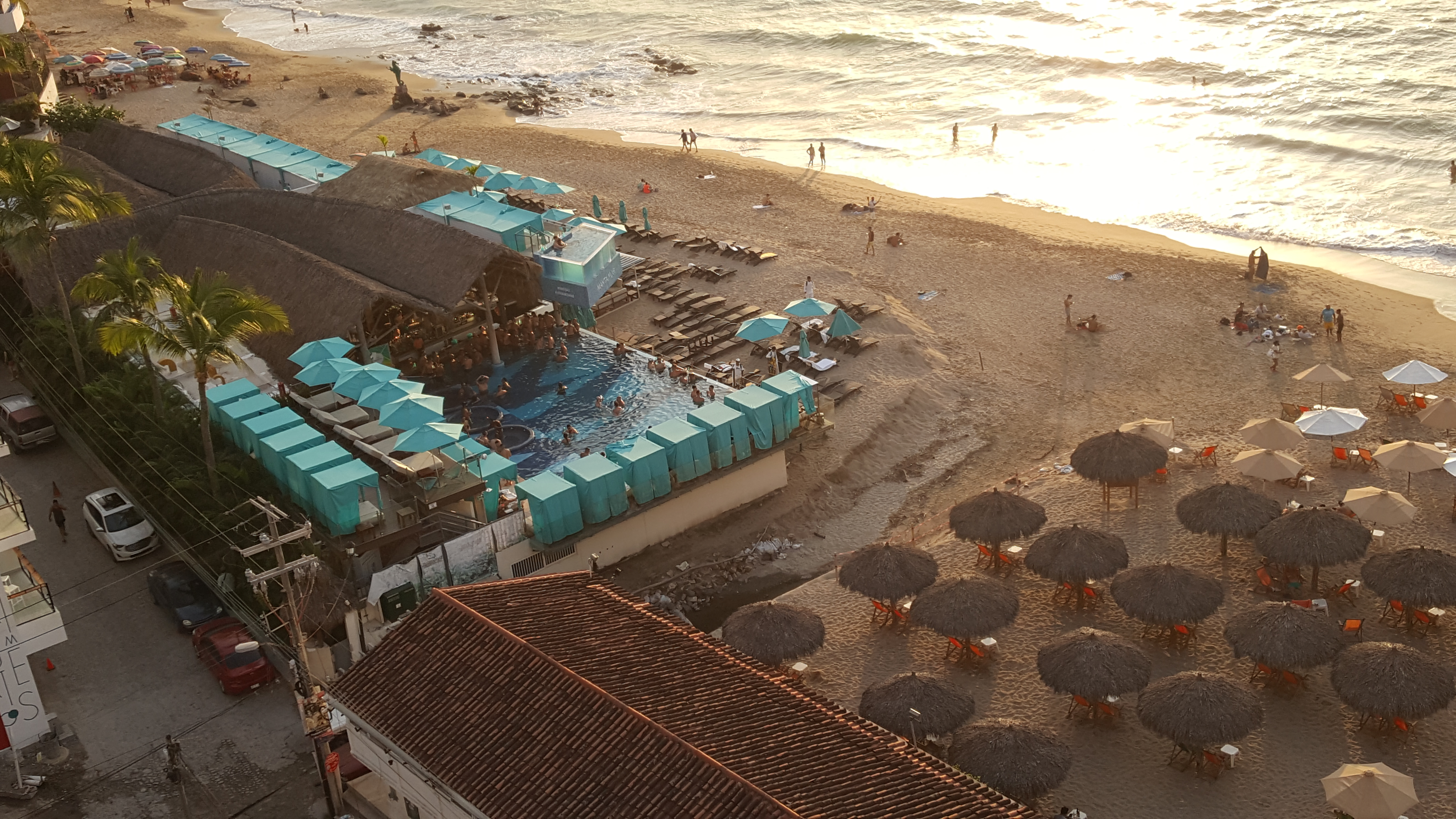
View of Mantamar Beach Club Bar & Sushi (left) and Ritmos Beach Cafe (right) along Playa de los Muertos, as seen from the rooftop of Blue Chairs Resort by the Sea, 2021

Almar Resort and Blue Chairs Resort by the Sea are popular gay resorts. Gay bars include Bar Frida, CC Slaughters, the martini bar Garbo, La Catrina Cantina, La Noche, Mr. Flamingo, Paco's Ranch, and Reinas Bar. Other gay-friendly establishments include Mantamar Beach Club Bar & Sushi and Ritmos Beach Cafe (nicknamed "green chairs") along Playa de los Muertos. The Palm Cabaret and Bar is a performance venue.
