= Ritmos Beach Cafe =

Beachfront cafe in Puerto Vallarta, Jalisco, Mexico

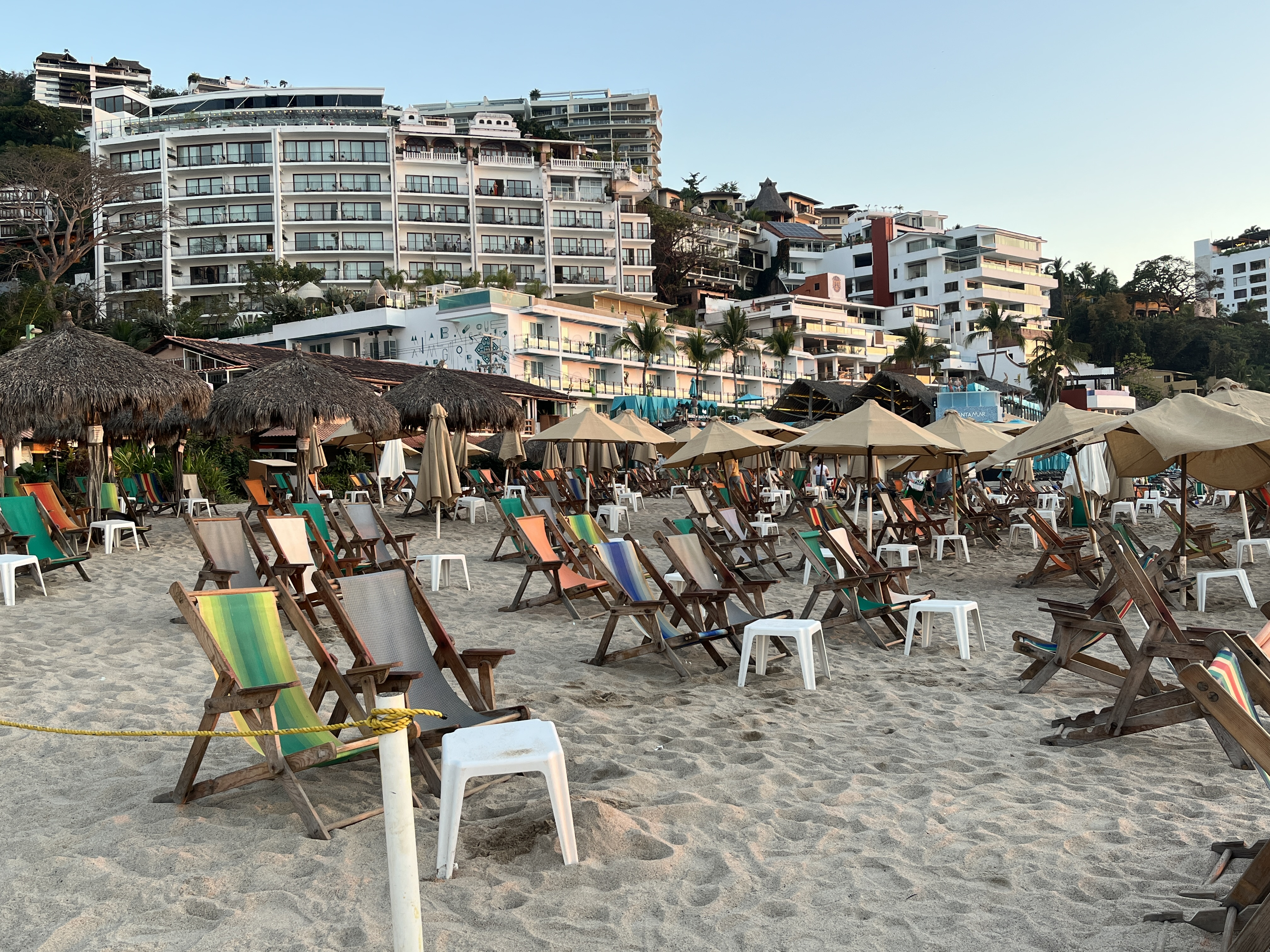
- Ritmos Beach Cafe with Almar Resort and Mantamar Beach Club Bar & Sushi in the background, 2023
- Interactive map of Ritmos Beach Cafe

Restaurant information
- Location: Puerto Vallarta, Jalisco, Mexico
- Coordinates: 20.5970°N 105.2394°W

Ritmos Beach Cafe (sometimes nicknamed "Green Chairs") is a gay-friendly beachfront cafe along Playa de los Muertos in Zona Romántica, Puerto Vallarta, in the Mexican state of Jalisco.

== Description and reception ==
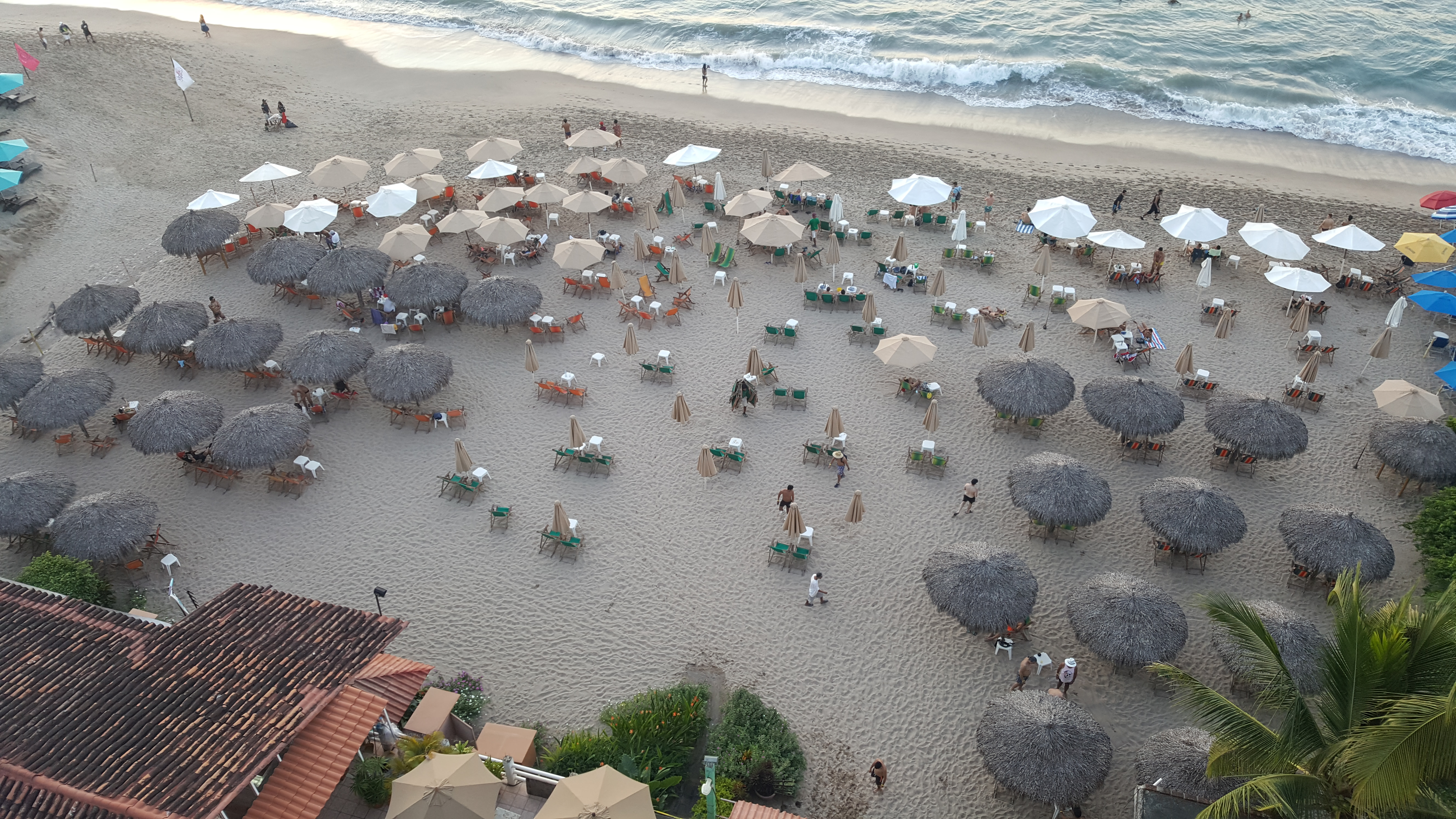
Aerial view, 2021

Located next to Blue Chairs Resort by the Sea, the cafe has mostly green chairs. In his Moon guide for Puerto Vallarta, Justin Henderson said the venue offers live music during afternoons and evenings and has a "fine continental menu all day long". Sometimes the live music is hosted at an upstairs stage.

Vendors often approach guests at their chairs. The cafe's menu includes an avocado, shrimp, and tomato salad, which was recommended by Bill Malcolm of Hotspots! Magazine in 2019. In his 2021 Fodor's guide of activities in Puerto Vallarta, Nathan Aguilera called Ritmos a "casual club" and said, "The service is good, the food is decent and affordably priced, and the drinks are strong."

== See also ==
- List of restaurants in Mexico
