= Las Amapas Beach =

Beach in Puerto Vallarta, Jalisco, Mexico

- Beach
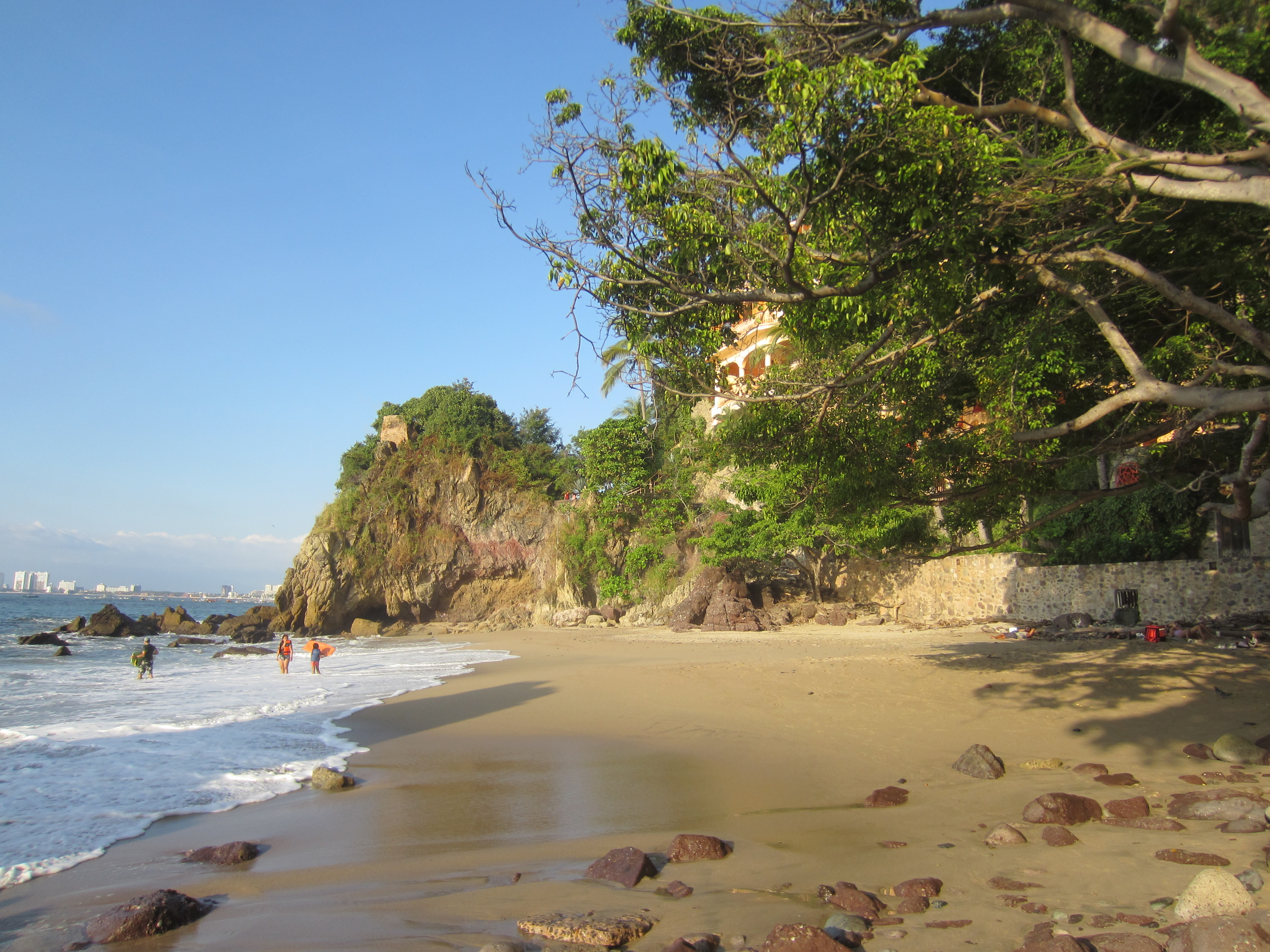
- The beach in 2021

- Coordinates: 20°35′42″N 105°14′28″W
- Location: Puerto Vallarta, Jalisco, Mexico

Las Amapas Beach (Spanish: "Playa Amapas") is a beach at the south end of Zona Romántica, Puerto Vallarta, in the Mexican state of Jalisco. The small beach is separated from Playa de los Muertos by a rock formation known as "El Púlpito" (English: "The Pulpit").
