= El Dorado (restaurant) =

Restaurant in Puerto Vallarta, Jalisco, Mexico

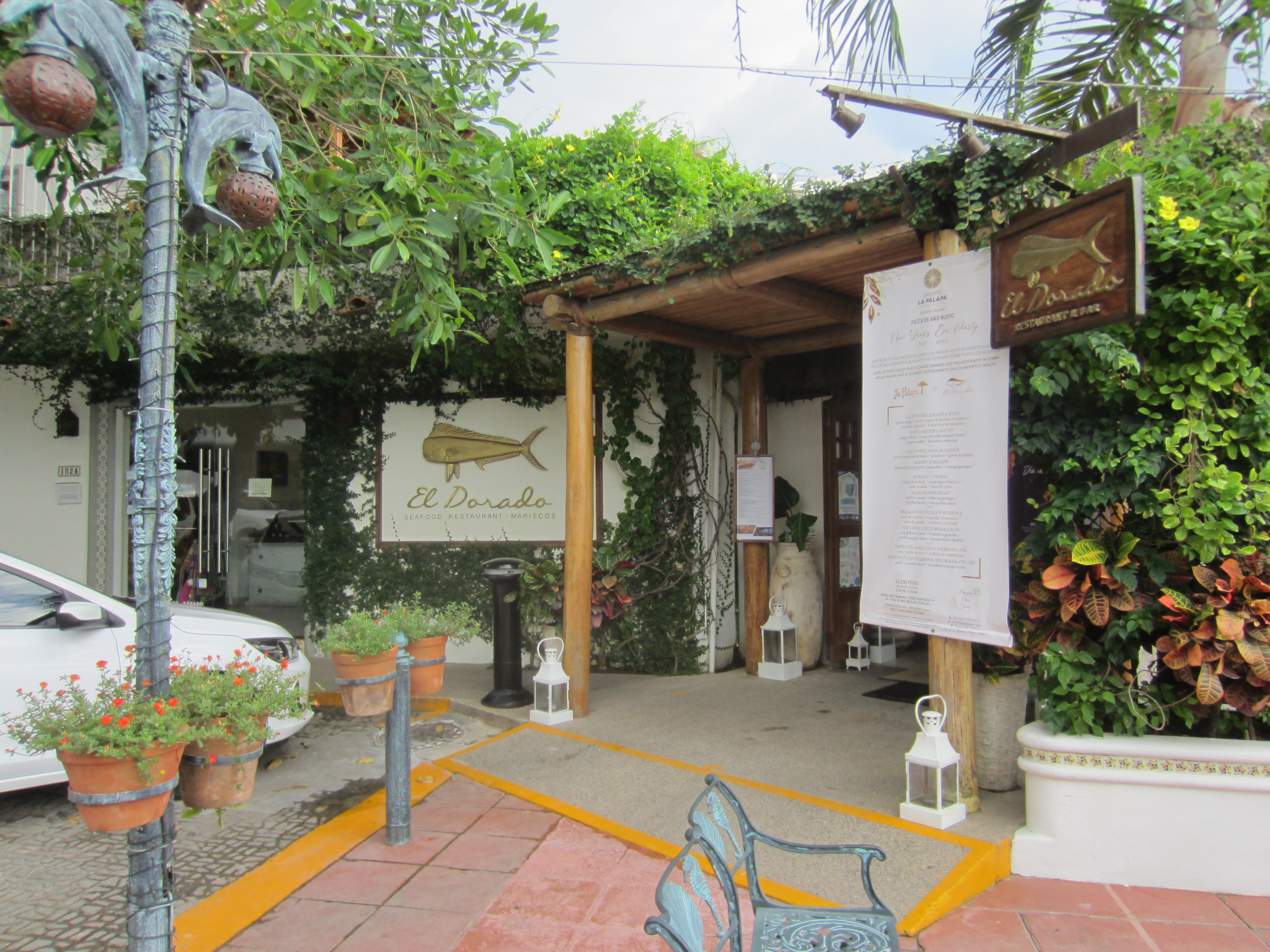
- The restaurant's exterior, 2021
- Interactive map of El Dorado

Restaurant information
- Food type: Mexican; seafood
- Location: Puerto Vallarta, Jalisco, Mexico
- Coordinates: 20.5992°N 105.2389°W

El Dorado is a restaurant in Zona Romántica, Puerto Vallarta, in the Mexican state of Jalisco.

== Description ==
Located along Playa de los Muertos, the restaurant serves Mexican cuisine and seafood. Menu options include lobster and bone marrow tacos, stone crab cakes, seared scallops, and New York Strip steak with asparagus wrapped in bacon.

== History ==
Spouses Guillermo Wulff and Nelly Barquet opened El Dorado in 1961. The business was frequented by Elizabeth Taylor, Eva Gardner, Richard Burton, and Rock Hudson.

According to Nathan Aguilera of Fodor's, El Dorado is a "sister restaurant" to La Palapa.

== See also ==
- List of Mexican restaurants
- List of restaurants in Mexico
- List of seafood restaurants
