= La Palapa =

Restaurant in Puerto Vallarta, Jalisco, Mexico

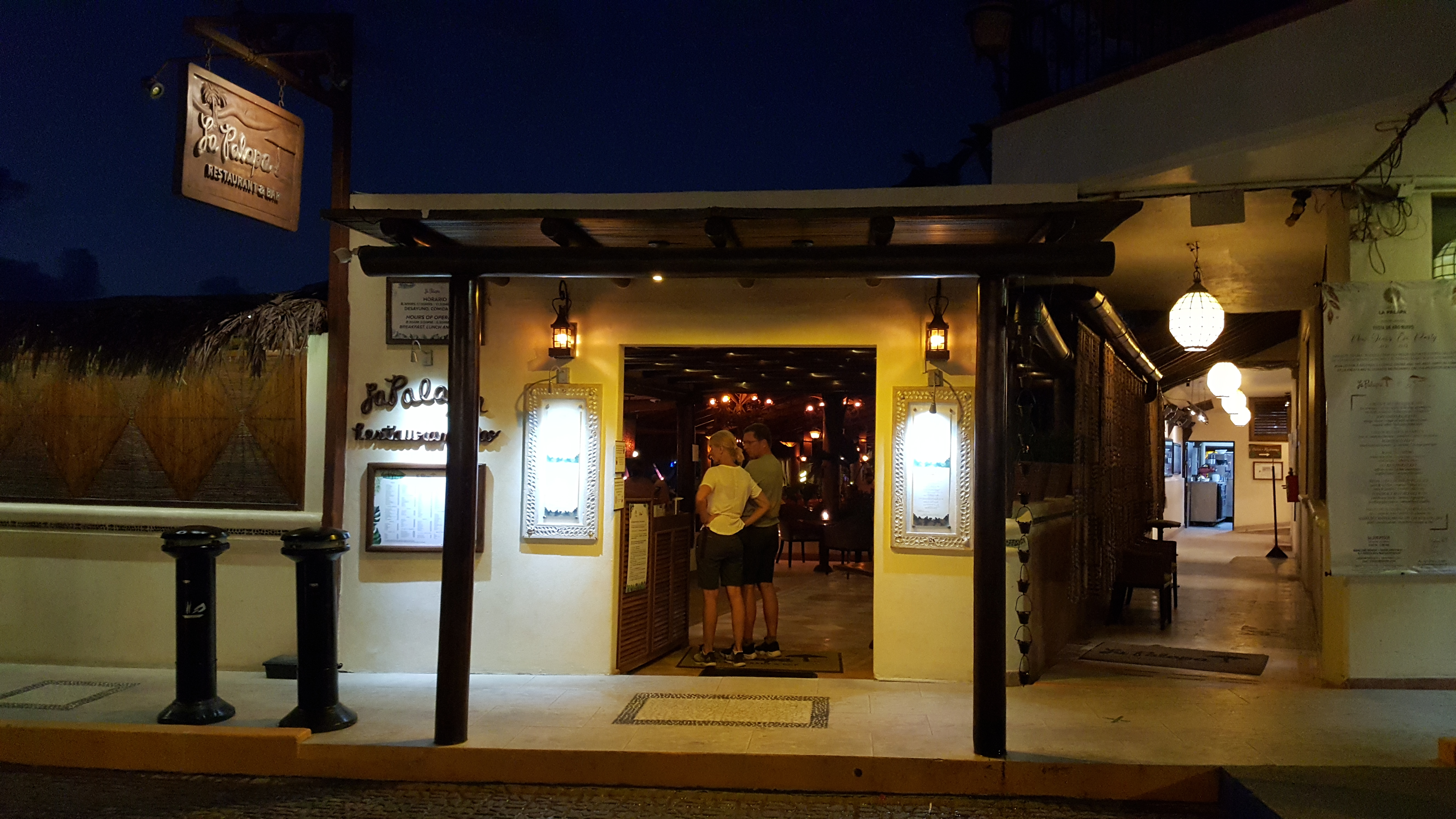
- Restaurant entrance, 2021
- Interactive map of La Palapa

Restaurant information
- Food type: Seafood
- Location: Puerto Vallarta, Jalisco, Mexico
- Coordinates: 20.5995°N 105.2387°W

La Palapa is a restaurant in Puerto Vallarta, in the Mexican state of Jalisco.

== Description ==
La Palapa, located along the Malecón at Playa de los Muertos in Zona Romántica, specializes in seafood. The restaurant is part of a hotel of the same name. According to Los Angeles magazine, the restaurant "has barefoot dining with unobstructed views of the sunset and the beautifully lit" Los Muertos Pier.

Fodor's says, "This large, welcoming, thatched-roof eatery is open to the breezes of Playa Los Muertos and filled with wicker-covered chandeliers, art-glass fixtures, and lazily rotating ceiling fans... The seafood enchilada plate is divine. It's pricey, but the beachfront location and, in the evening, the low lights and Latin jazz combo (8 to 11 pm nightly), keep people coming back. Breakfast here (daily after 8 am) is popular with locals as well as visitors. This is the sister property to Vista Grill, which has great views of the bay from the hills above town." According to Frommer's, which rates the restaurant 2 out of 3 stars, "This beachside palapa restaurant defines enchantment, a decades-old favorite with beautiful amber lamps, candles, and lanterns illuminating the night... The Palapa's location on Los Muertos Beach makes dinner especially enticing for moon watching over the bay. The bar opens to the dining area and features acoustic guitars and vocals nightly from 8 to 11pm. The restaurant doubles as a beach club during the day."

=== Menu ===
According to Fodor's, "The menu meanders among international dishes with modern presentation." It includes miso Chilean sea bass, pepper-crusted yellowfin tuna, grilled shrimp in coconut and tequila, and pork tenderloin stuffed with chorizo, pecans, and goat cheese. Roasted stuffed chicken breast, pork loin, and seared yellowfin tuna drizzled in cacao sauce are also available. The restaurant has also served oysters, peach-and-pistachio salad, red snapper, and risotto with clams and shrimp, as well as chilaquiles, huevos rancheros, and pancakes with various toppings.

== Reception ==
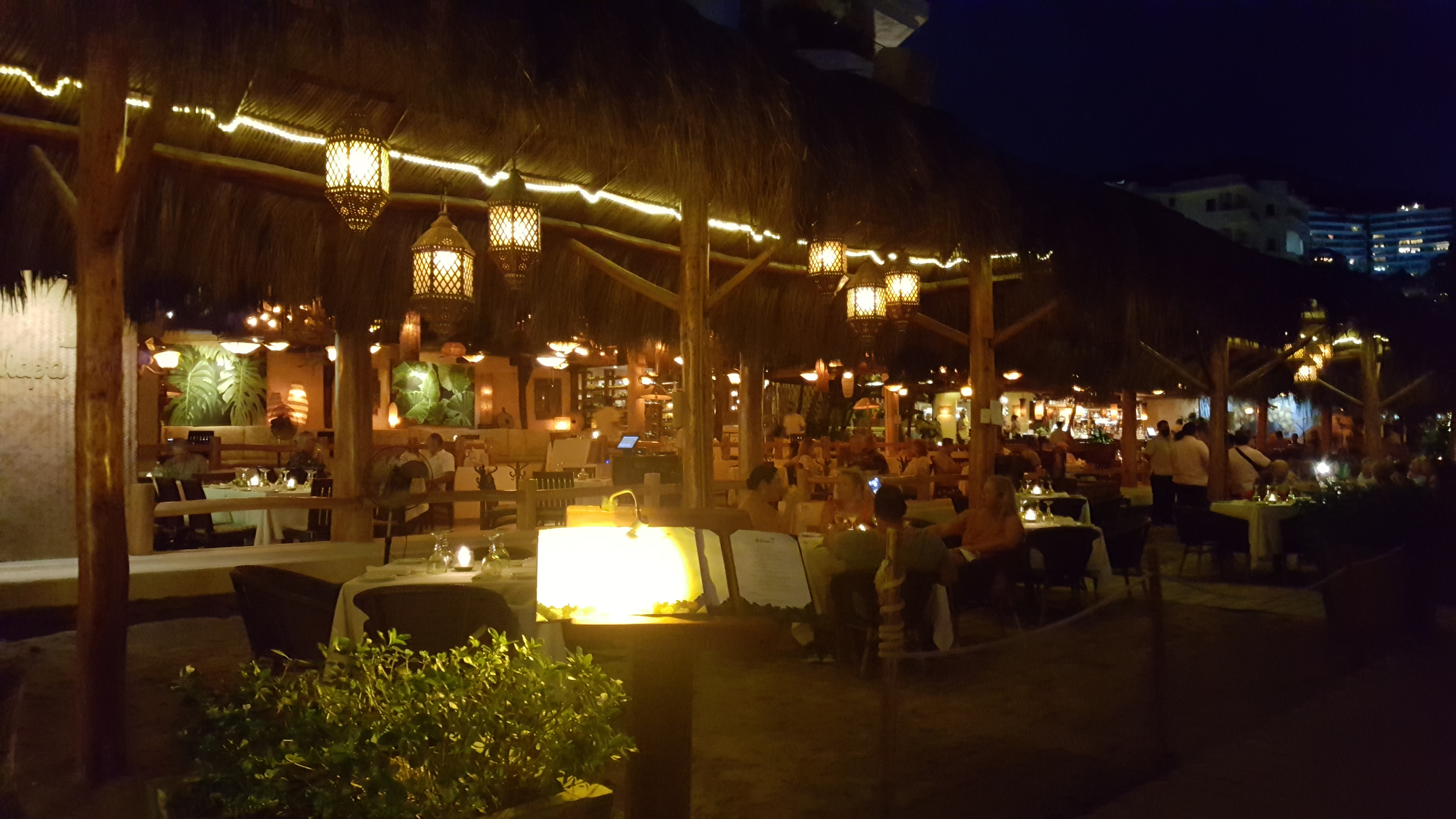
Diners at the restaurant, 2021

The Daily Telegraph has described La Palapa as a "glam favourite" of Elizabeth Taylor. In 2011, Kris Hudson of The Washington Post recommend La Palapa for "finer" dining. The Travel Channel's list of the "5 Top Places to Eat Like a Local in Puerto Vallarta" says, "La Palapa was the first restaurant to be opened on the beach in Puerto Vallarta in 1958, and has become a big part of the city's history."

Guides by Moon Publications describe La Palapa as one of the city's "most acclaimed spots for beachfront romance", and recommend the restaurant for a romantic dinner during golden hour. The American Automobile Association has given the restaurant a three-diamond rating. In 2023, Debora Mestre included La Palapa in The Infatuation's overview of the best bars and restaurants in Puerto Vallarta, and the business was one of OpenTable's top 50 restaurants in Mexico.

== See also ==
- List of restaurants in Mexico
- List of seafood restaurants
