= Kaiser Maximilian =

Restaurant in Puerto Vallarta, Jalisco, Mexico

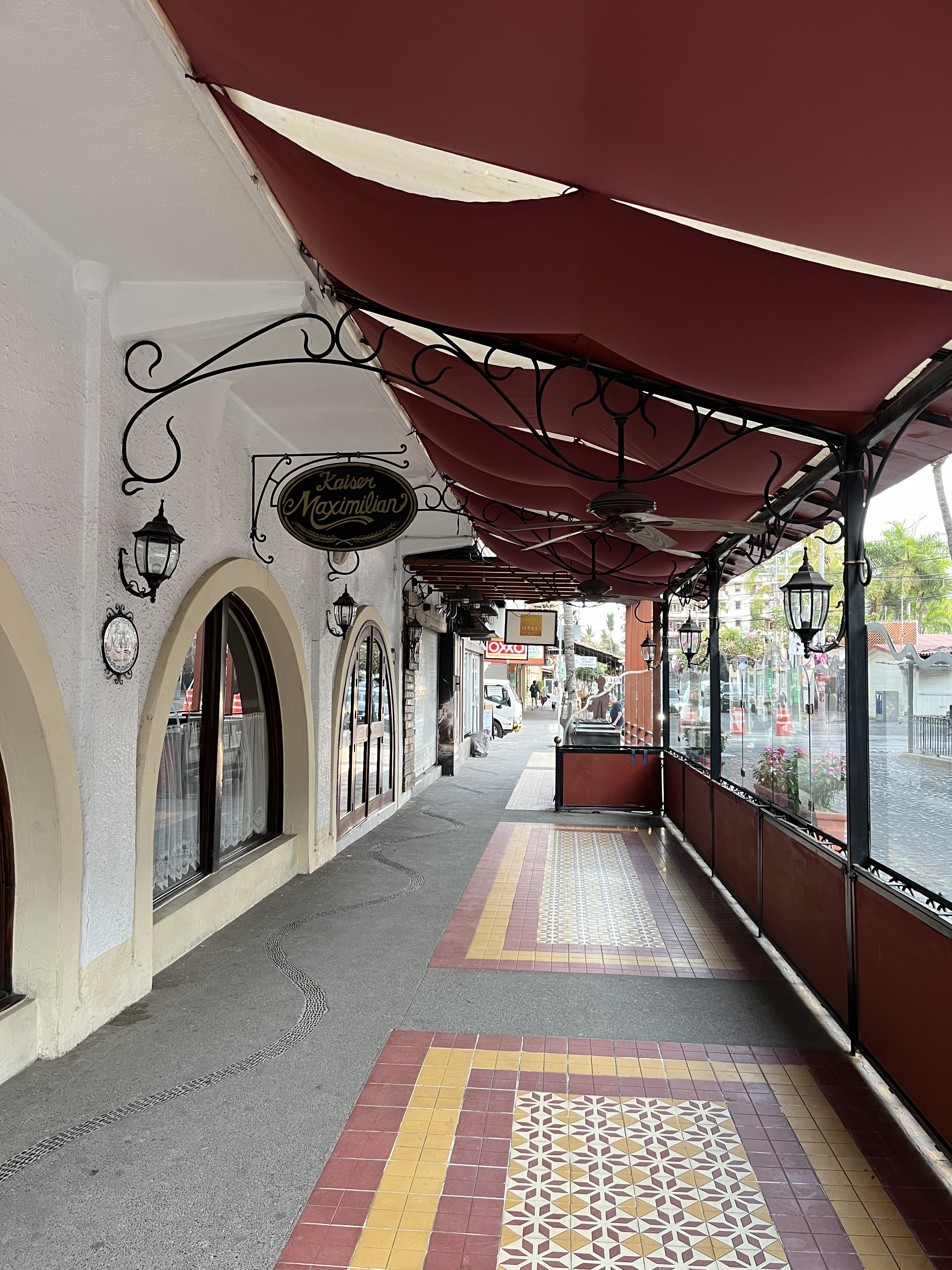
- The restaurant's exterior and covered sidewalk, 2023
- Interactive map of Kaiser Maximilian

Restaurant information
- Established: 1995
- Owner: Andreas Rupprechter-Angleberger
- Food type: Austrian
- Location: Puerto Vallarta, Jalisco, Mexico
- Coordinates: 20°36′06″N 105°14′16″W
- Website: kaisermaximilian.com

Kaiser Maximilian is an Austrian restaurant in Puerto Vallarta's Zona Romántica neighborhood, in the Mexican state of Jalisco. Owned by Andreas Rupprechter-Angleberger, the restaurant was established in 1995.

== Description ==
Kaiser Maximilian is an Austrian restaurant in the Los Arcos hotel, along Olas Altas in Puerto Vallarta's Zona Romántica neighborhood. Tampa Bay Magazine has described Kaiser Maximilian as an "elegant European-styled sidewalk café". The restaurant has a traditional European atmosphere, with dark wood, lace cafe curtains, and polished brass. It has also been described as upscale, with an "old-European slant". Among Viennese and continental dishes are herb-crusted lamb with horseradish and vegetables au gratin, venison with chestnut sauce and braised cabbage, prune-stuffed quail with polenta, scalloped rahmschnitzel with noodles in a mushroom sauce, and apple strudel.

== History ==
Kaiser Maximilian opened in 1995. The restaurant is owned by Andreas Rupprechter-Angleberger.

== Reception ==
Frommer's has rated the restaurant two out of three stars.

== See also ==
- List of restaurants in Mexico
