= The Blue Shrimp =

Restaurant in Puerto Vallarta, Jalisco, Mexico

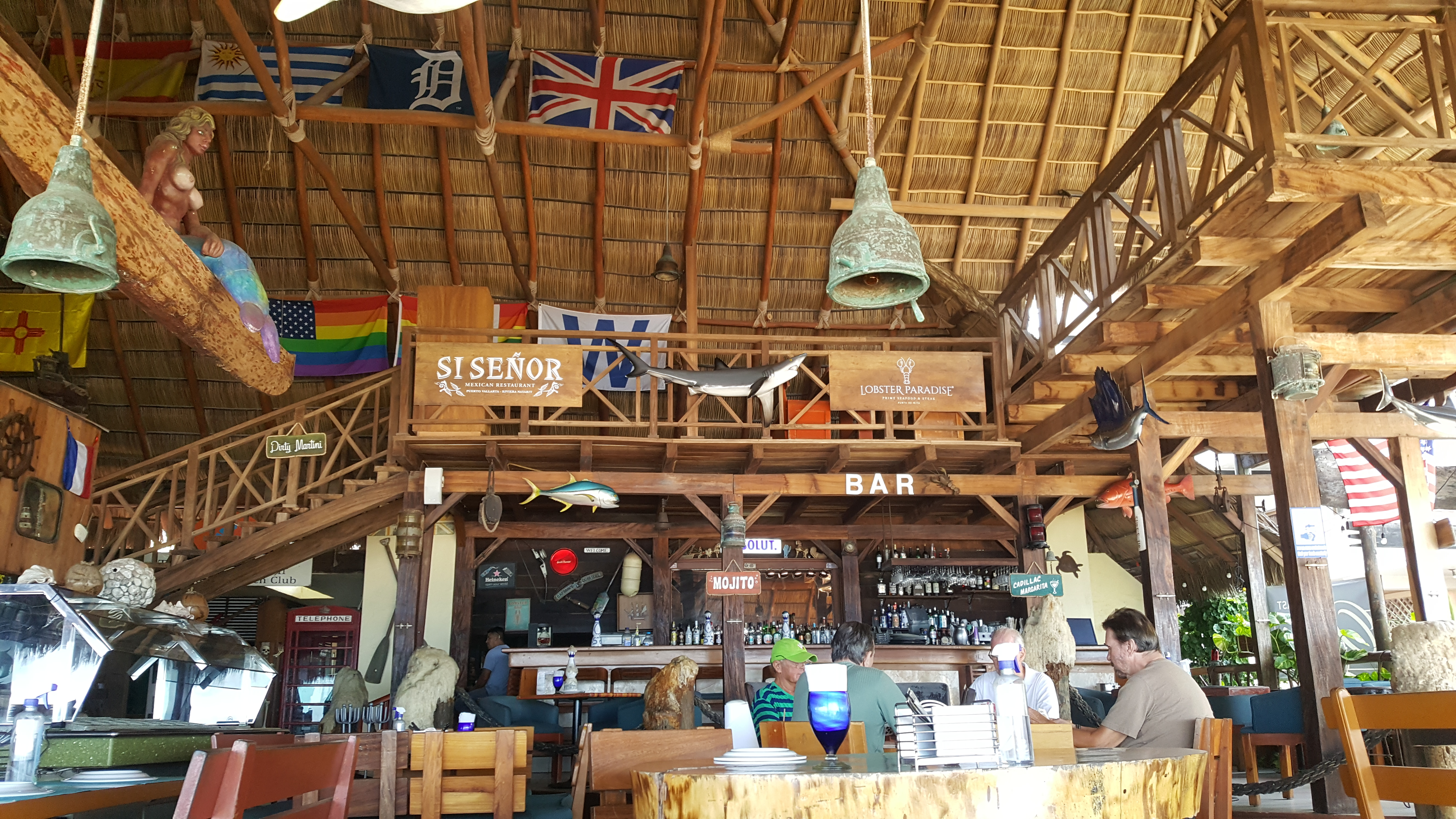
- The restaurant's interior in 2021
- Interactive map of The Blue Shrimp

Restaurant information
- Established: 1999; 27 years ago
- Food type: Seafood
- Location: Puerto Vallarta, Jalisco, Mexico
- Coordinates: 20.6026°N 105.2383°W

The Blue Shrimp is a seafood restaurant in Zona Romántica, Puerto Vallarta, in the Mexican state of Jalisco. It was established on Morelos Street in 1999, and relocated to Playa de los Muertos in 2010.

== Description ==
In her 2020 Moon guide for Puerto Vallarta, Madeline Milne describes The Blue Shrimp as a "sophisticated palapa-style restaurant with beautiful natural decor". The interior features "relics of ancient ships" and walls resembling reefs. Aquariums and blue lights also contribute to the nautical theme. Fodor's says, The Blue Shrimp is a beautiful beachfront thatched-roof palapa restaurant right on the heart of the Zona Romántica. The restaurant specializes in seafood dishes.

== History ==
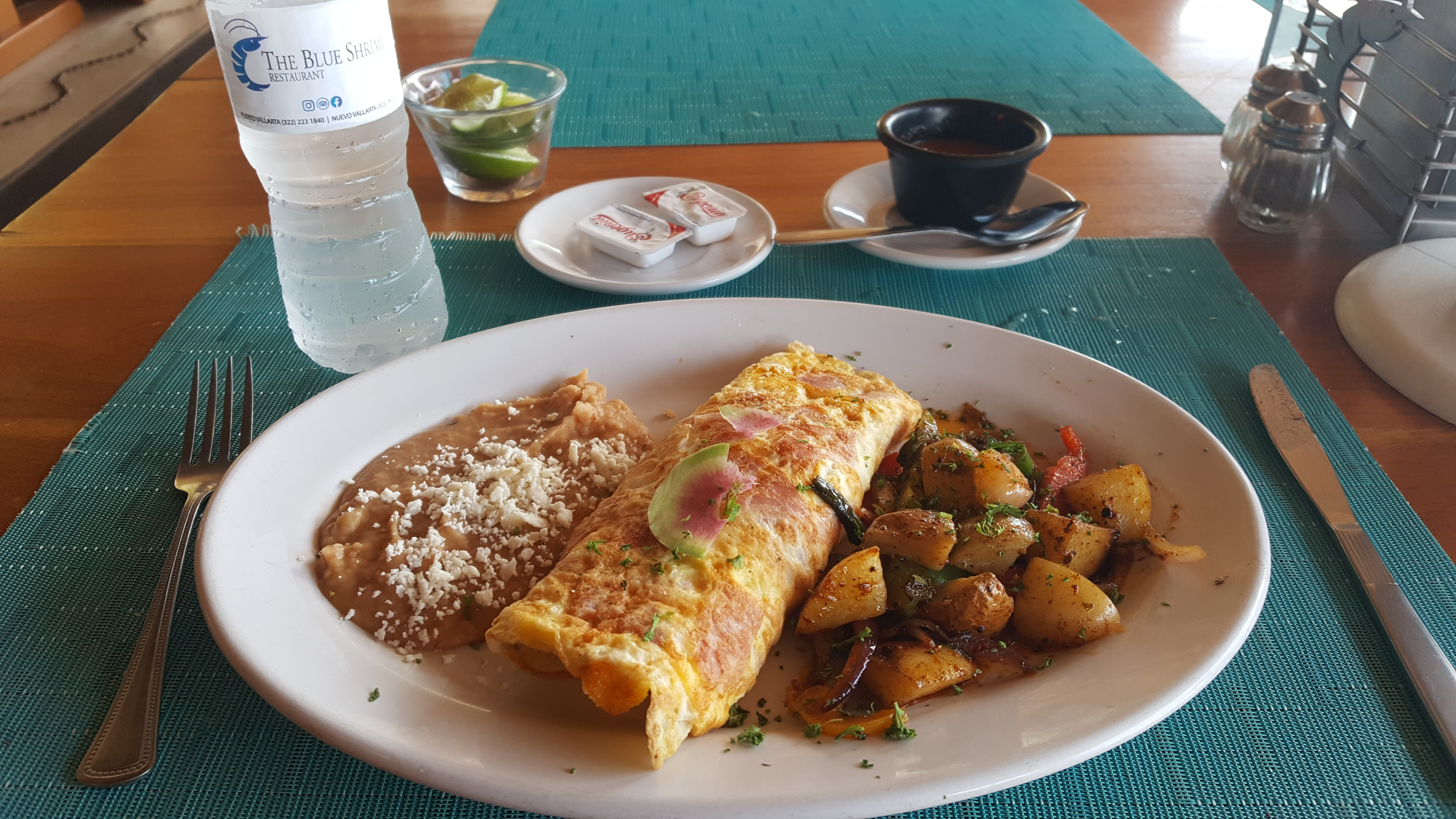
Ham and cheese omelette served with refried beans and potatoes

The restaurant was established in 1999 and originally located on Morelos street. It relocated to Playa de los Muertos in 2010. The Blue Shrimp participated in Restaurant Week in 2018.

== Reception ==
Debora Mestre included the restaurant in the website's 2023 overview of Puerto Vallarta's best bars and restaurants. The American Automobile Association has given The Blue Shrimp a three-diamond rating and has described the restaurant as "the spot for shrimp lovers".

== See also ==
- List of restaurants in Mexico
- List of seafood restaurants
