= Almar Resort =

LGBT resort in Puerto Vallarta, Jalisco, Mexico

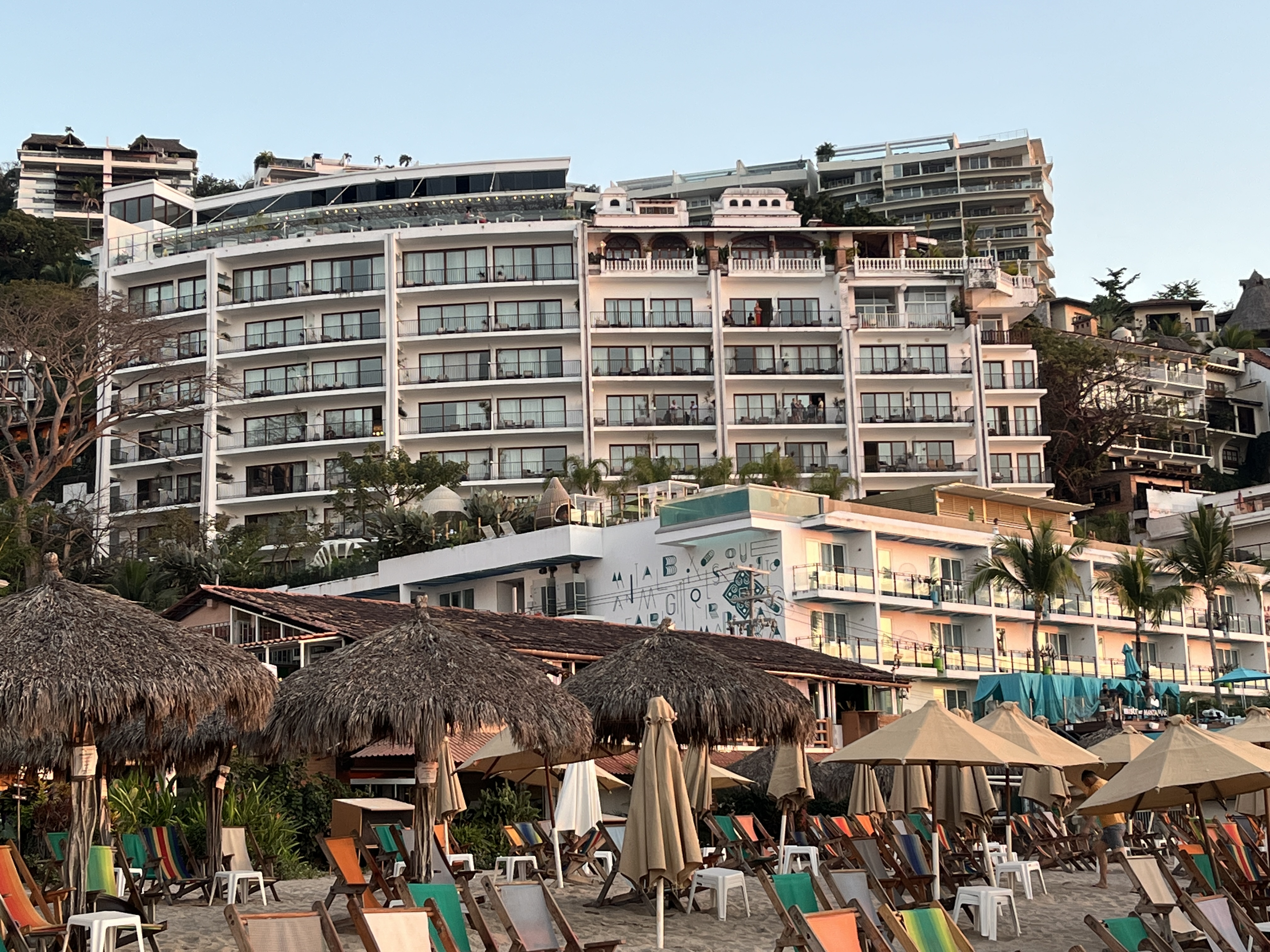
- Almar Resort with Ritmos Beach Cafe (left) and Mantamar Beach Club Bar & Sushi (right) in the foreground, 2023
- Interactive map of the Almar Resort area

General information
- Location: Puerto Vallarta, Jalisco, Mexico
- Coordinates: 20.5962°N 105.2390°W

Almar Resort is a luxury LGBTQ resort in Puerto Vallarta's Zona Romántica, in the Mexican state of Jalisco.

== Description ==
Almar Resort is a 100-room beachfront property in Zona Romántica, Puerto Vallarta. It is an adults-only gay hotel and the city's only LGBT+ resort. Out magazine has said Almar "boasts dazzling ocean views and a nearly all-queer clientele". The property features a gay sky bar called Top and a pool and lounge area called Eden. Mantamar Beach Club Bar & Sushi is also associated with Almar Resort.

== History ==
Almar Resort is owned by Vidal Meza and his brother, who also own Mantamar. According to Ed Walsh of SFGate, "Meza estimates that about 85% to 90% of Almar's guests, who tend to be a younger, hipper crowd, are from the U.S."

Ross Mathews got married at the resort in 2022. He and his husband met at Almar two years prior.

== Reception ==
Almar Resort was recognized by Mexico's LGBTQ+ Travel Awards in 2023.
