= Lázaro Cárdenas Park =

Park in Puerto Vallarta, Jalisco, Mexico

- Parque Lázaro Cárdenas
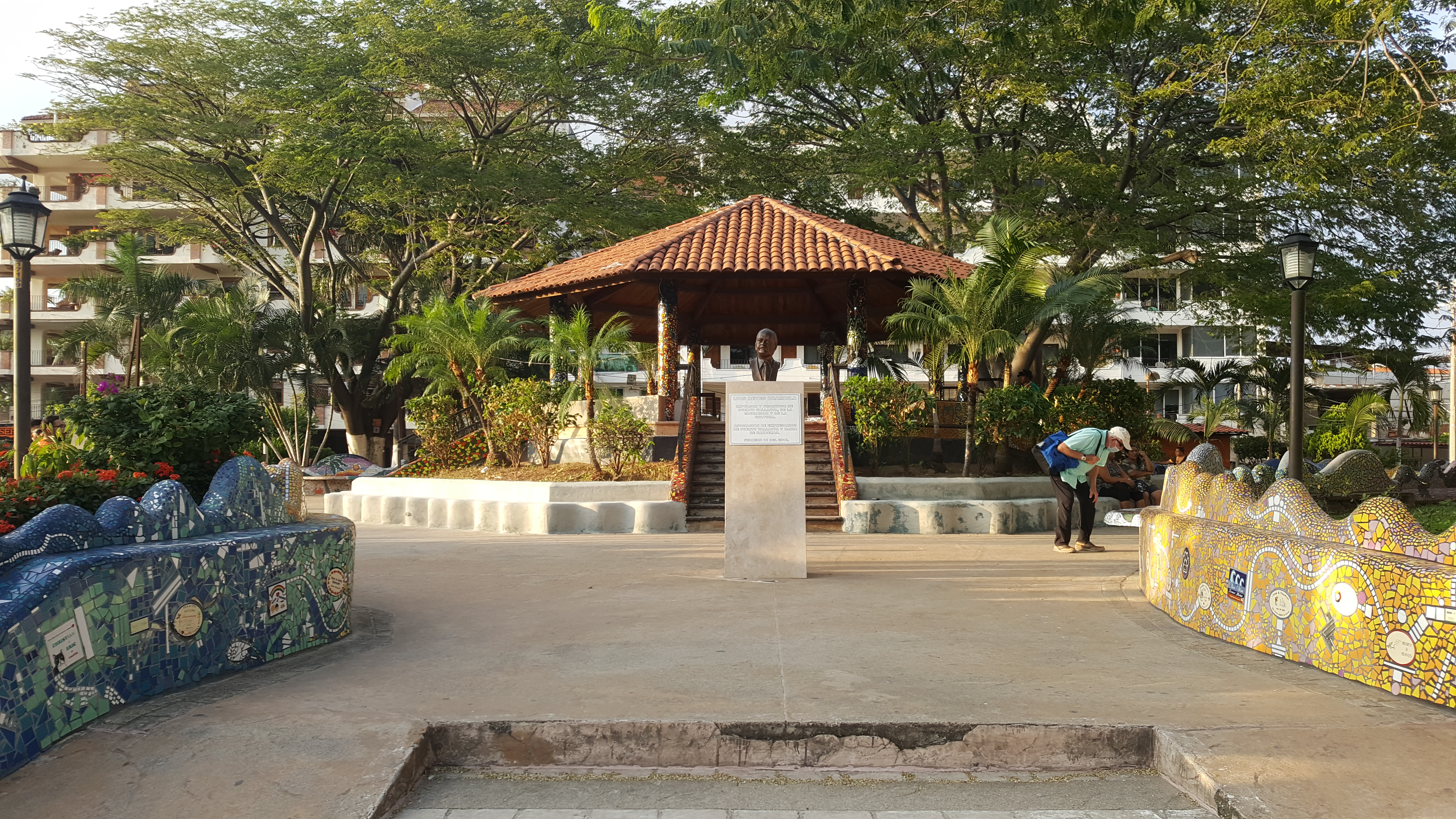
- The park's bandstand, 2021

- Location within Mexico
- Location: Puerto Vallarta, Jalisco, Mexico
- Coordinates: 20°36′10.5″N 105°14′15″W

Lázaro Cárdenas Park (Spanish: Parque Lázaro Cárdenas) is a park in Puerto Vallarta's Zona Romántica, in the Mexican state of Jalisco.

== Features ==
A statue of Lázaro Cárdenas and the sculpture Ándale Bernardo are installed in the park.

Natasha Moraga is completing an art project called Tile Park (Spanish: Parque de los Azulejos).

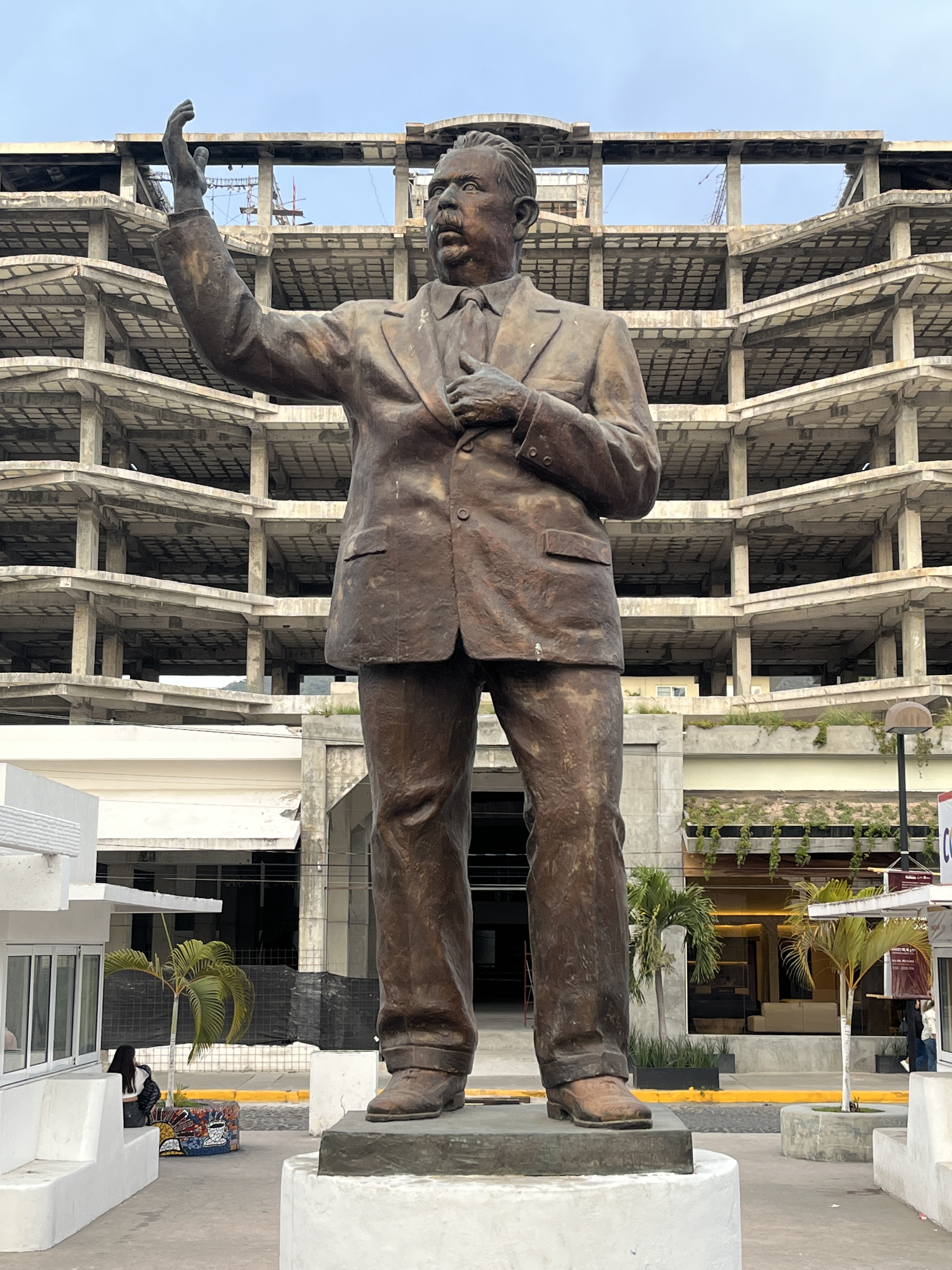
Statue of Lázaro Cárdenas, 2023

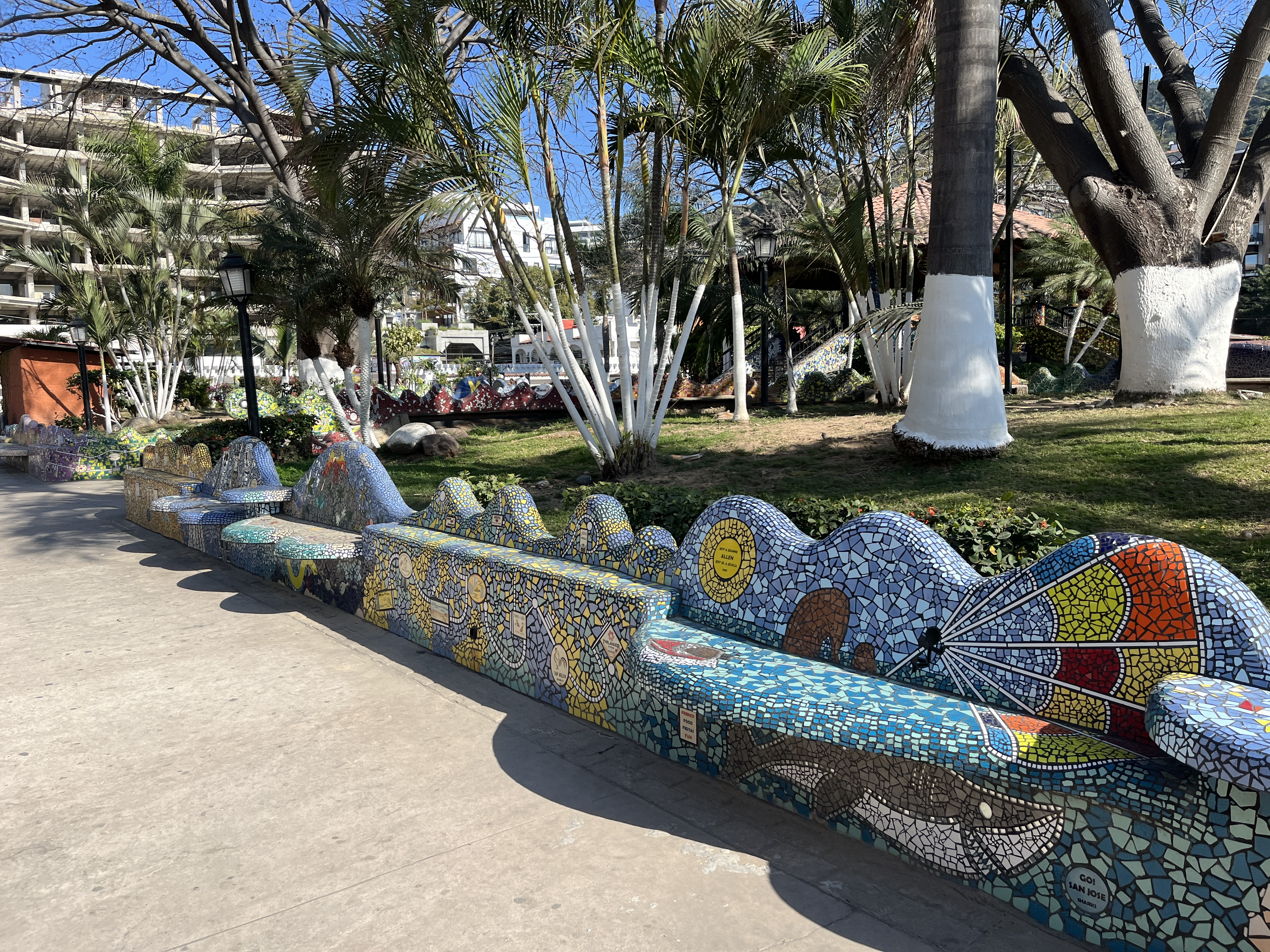
Tile benches, 2023
