= Playa Olas Altas =

Beach in Puerto Vallarta, Jalisco, Mexico

- Beach

- Location within Mexico
- Coordinates: 20°36′16″N 105°14′19″W
- Location: Puerto Vallarta, Jalisco, Mexico

Playa Olas Altas (English: High Waves Beach) is a beach in Puerto Vallarta's Zona Romántica, in the Mexican state of Jalisco.

== Description ==
South of the Cuale River, Lonely Planet describes the beach as the "handiest" one to the Zona Centro. According to Fodor's, "The beach attracts fewer sunbathers than Los Muertos but is otherwise an extension of that beach, and it gets lively during holidays with sunbathers and impromptu snack stands and shaded tables on the sand. There are good views of the recently renovated Los Muertos Pier and spectacular lighting at night. Facing Olas Altas Beach near Lázaro Cárdenas plaza are open-air stands selling beach accessories, small grocery stores, and beach-facing bar-restaurants."
