= Playa de los Muertos (Puerto Vallarta) =

Beach in Puerto Vallarta, Mexico

- Beach
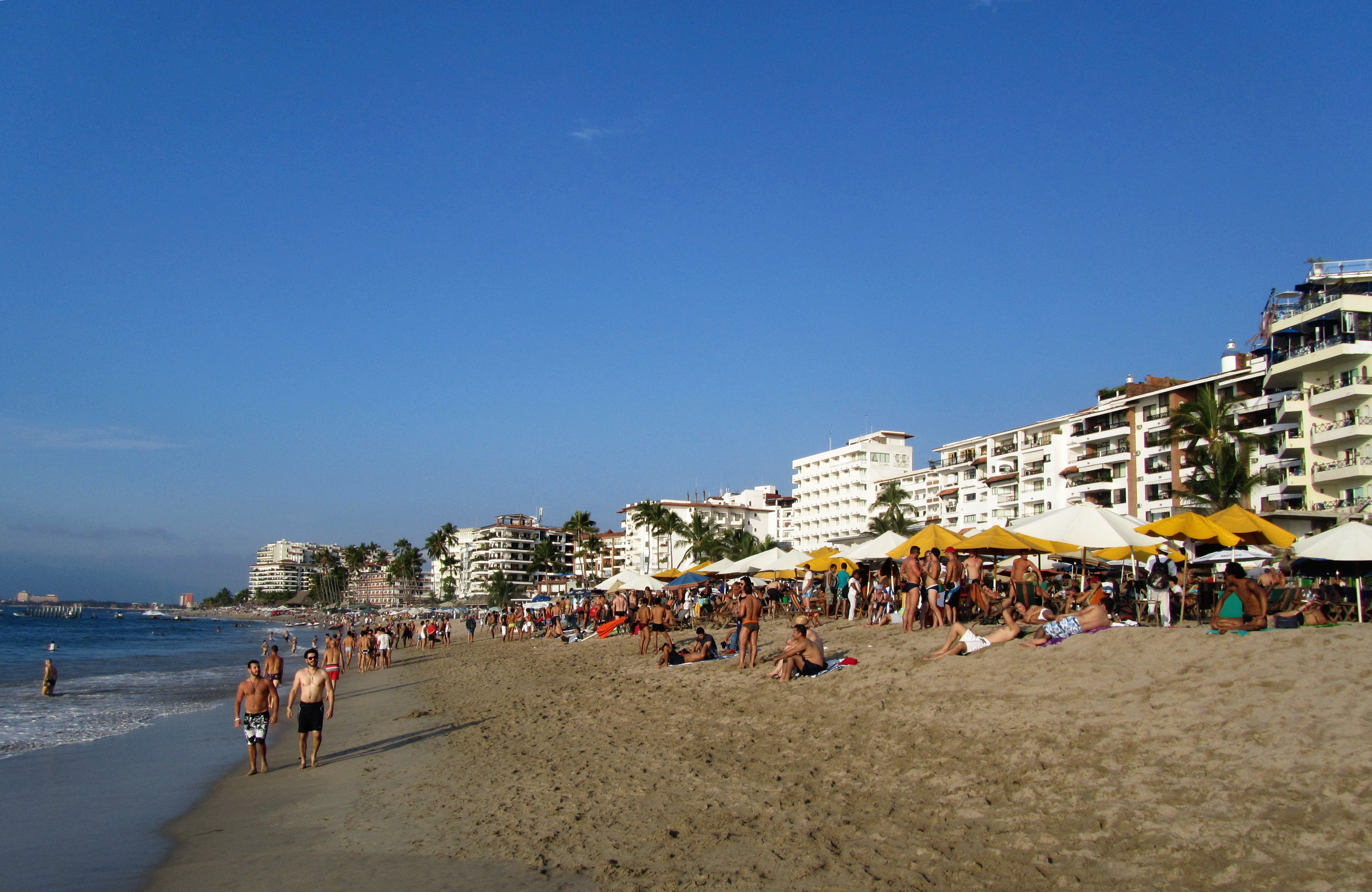
- The beach in 2011

- Location within Mexico
- Coordinates: 20°35′55″N 105°14′22″W
- Location: Puerto Vallarta, Jalisco, Mexico

Playa de los Muertos (English: Beach of the Dead) is a beach in Puerto Vallarta's Zona Romántica, in the Mexican state of Jalisco.

== History ==
During the 16th century, Hernán Cortés explored the Pacific side of Mexico by ship. Cortes used the established port of Acapulco to resupply and anchor his ships along the journey. During the early 1500s, he sent two of his ships North to explore the coastline without him. One of his ships wrecked in Banderas Bay and all but three of the crew died. It is believed the corpses of the lost sailors washed ashore. Native villagers encountered numerous corpses on the beach for days following the wreck.

== Description ==
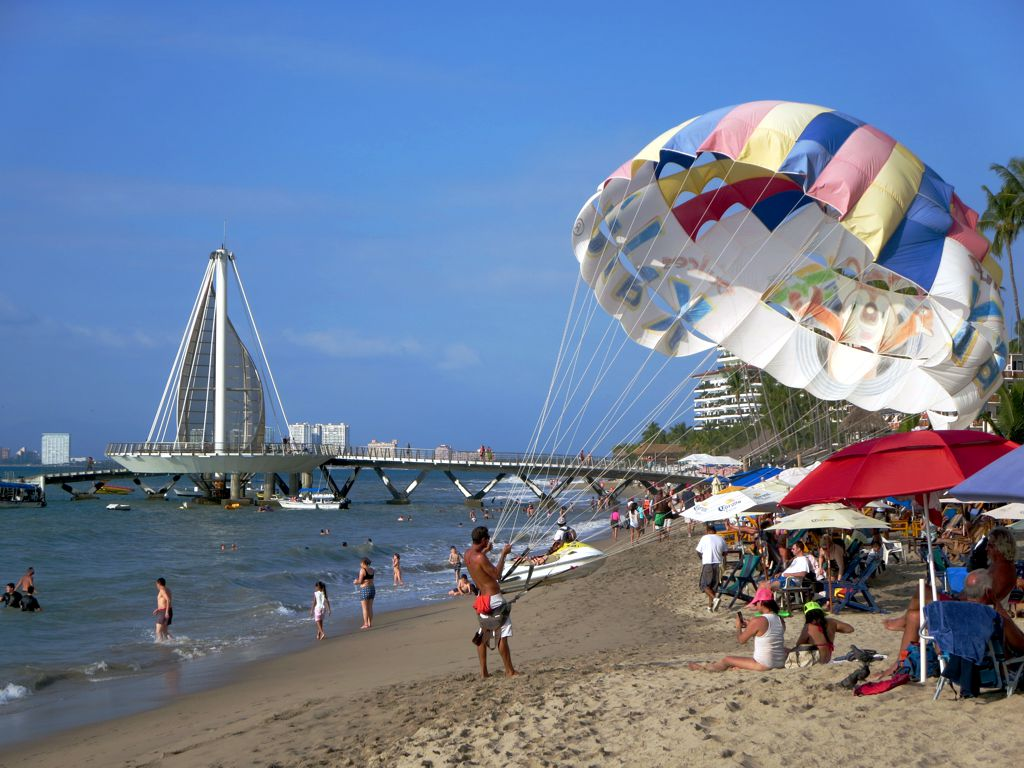
The beach and Los Muertos Pier, which serves as a base for water taxis to Yelapa.

The beach has Los Muertos Pier. Restaurants along the beach include The Blue Shrimp, El Dorado, and La Palapa. LGBT-friendly establishments include Blue Chairs Resort by the Sea, Mantamar Beach Club Bar & Sushi, and Ritmos Beach Cafe. One of the city's two copies of The Boy on the Seahorse is installed on the beach's southern end.

== Reception ==
The city's most popular shoreline, Playa de los Muertos ranked number four in U.S. News & World Report's list of best things to do in Puerto Vallarta. Daniel Avery ranked the beach second in Newsweek's 2019 list of the world's ten best gay beaches.
