= Pancho's Takos =

Restaurant in Puerto Vallarta, Jalisco, Mexico

- Interactive map of Pancho's Takos

Restaurant information
- Established: 1989
- Food type: Mexican
- Location: Puerto Vallarta, Jalisco, Mexico
- Coordinates: 20.6020°N 105.2375°W

Pancho's Takos is a taqueria in Puerto Vallarta's Zona Romántica, in the Mexican state of Jalisco.

== Description ==
The taqueria serves tacos, fajitas, and quesadillas. Tacos al pastor is a specialty; the menu also includes stuffed avocados (chicken, beef, or mushrooms), au gratin potatoes (with steak, chorizo, or al pastor), and cheese alambres. The drink menu includes domestic beers, cocktails, fruitades, and wine.

== History ==
The restaurant opened in 1989. The establishment only accepts cash, as of 2018.

== Reception ==
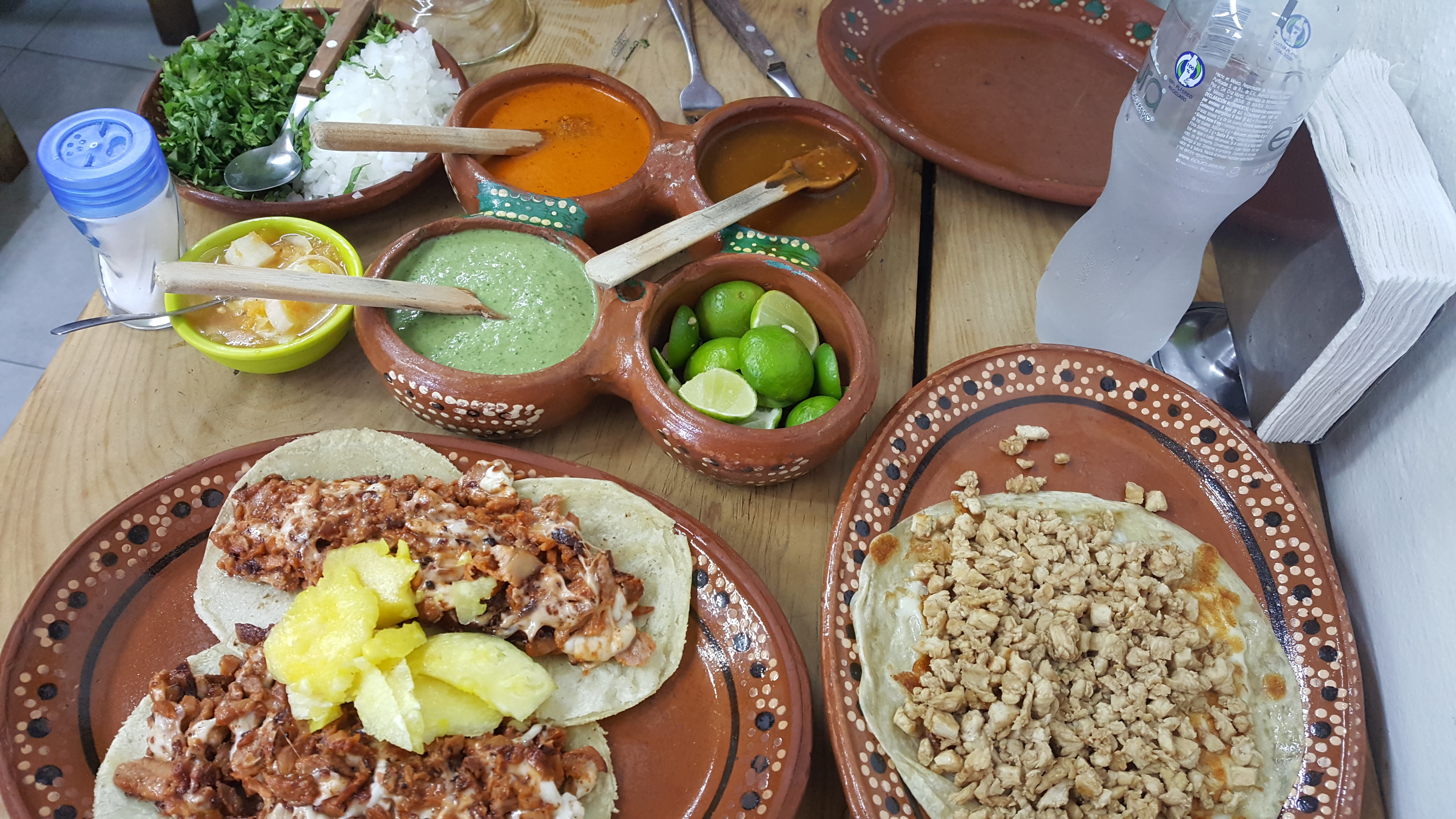
Tacos al pastor (left) and chicken quesadilla (right)

Lonely Planet says, "Drawing a regular nighttime crowd, this humble taquería near the beach is a solid contender for the best tacos al pastor (spit-cooked pork with diced onions, cilantro and pineapple) in the 'hood and attracts hungry night owls after many neighborhood restaurants have closed." The 2014 book 101 Places to Get F*cked Up Before You Die: The Ultimate Travel Guide to Partying Around the World noted the frequent queue for service and says, "By many accounts, the very best pastor in town is at Takos Pancho's." In Banderas News' 2015 overview of the city's best tacos, Shannon Beston wrote, "Pancho's Takos was above and beyond the top choice, even though many people refer to it as being too touristy. However, overlooking the fact that it seems to get a lot of PR on sites such as Trip Advisor, it's also a spot-on favorite with Mexicans."

Vallarta Lifestyles said in 2018: "They say that the best sign of whether a taco stand is good is the number of people who frequent it, and Pancho's Takos confirms this premise. Since 1989, they have been offering tacos al pastor so delicious that they attract both residents and visitors." In 2019, Thrillist's Meagan Drillinger said, "If you'd rather a sit-down meal, you can line up with the rest of the world at Pancho's Takos. Yes, the quesadillas al pastor are absolutely worth the wait… but you will be waiting a long, long time, especially late-night when the bars start to close." In 2021, Nathan Aguilera of Fodor's included Pancho's Takos in a list of "21 Ultimate Things to Do in Puerto Vallarta". He wrote, "Puerto Vallarta has one of the most famous stands in all of Mexico: Pancho's Takos ... Come early or be prepared to get in line, and when it's your turn to order, ask for tacos al pastor, arguably the most famous tacos in Mexico."

== See also ==
- List of Mexican restaurants
- List of restaurants in Mexico
