= Natasha Moraga =

American-born Mexican tile artist

- Born: La Mirada, California, U.S.
- Known for: Trencadís

Natasha Moraga is an American-born Mexican tile artist who specializes in the trencadis technique. She has created a number of murals in Puerto Vallarta, and is currently working on a project (Parque de los Azulejos) to completely cover the Lázaro Cárdenas Park in tiles. Her work method is community-based, and she started Mosayko Vallarta to organize volunteer participation in projects.

== Biography ==
Natasha Moraga was born in La Mirada, California, to a Mexican mother and Chilean father. She has American and Mexican citizenship, the latter through her mother.

At the age of eight, Moraga's family moved to Mexico so that the children would have a more Latin-American education. They lived on a ranch in the Guadalajara area before moving to Puerto Vallarta. Moraga stated that she did not like her first years in Mexico, but does not regret her parents' decision nor does she consider returning to live in the United States.

At age 15 Moraga rebelled against her parents and left home. For a time she lived a nomadic lifestyle and lived with different friends. With one of these friends, she lived in Germany and visited Barcelona, where she discovered the trencadís work of Antoni Gaudí in 2005. Moraga wanted to be an artist, and the tile work interested her because of its highly tactile nature.

She returned to Puerto Vallarta and acquired a scholarship to train with mosaic artist Isaiah Zagar for a week in Philadelphia in 2009. Despite the time in Philadelphia, she did not go into art right away. Her father, a businessman in Puerto Vallarta, convinced her to open a restaurant. She ran it for two years before she decided it was not what she wanted to do and she shut it down in 2010.

== Projects ==
Natasha Moraga is the artistic director of some of Puerto Vallarta's artworks found on benches, stairs, and other public spaces. This type of mosaic work was new to Puerto Vallarta and is uncommon in Mexico. Moraga classifies her work as "community-based" and "street art" .

Moraga created her first tile mural on a wall near the Emiliano Zapata neighborhood. The wall encloses a public kindergarten on the corner of Pino Suarez and Basilio Badillo streets and had been covered in graffiti. After receiving permission to place a tile mural on the wall, Moraga began working from October 2011 to February 2012 and titled the completed mural Episodio 1. Sponsorship became the main source of financing projects from the time a woman came up to Moraga during this time and offered her US$100 to put her name on one of the tiles. After finishing this mural, Moraga made a list of ten places she wanted to add mosaic to.

Her second project was done in the Marina Vallarta neighborhood on Albatros Street near the American School. This project ran from 2013 to 2015. The mural, called Episodio 2 is over 500 square meters (5,400 sq ft) and is the second-largest mosaic mural in Mexico.

Moraga's next project worked on the meters-high letters that spell Puerto Vallarta facing the traffic coming in from the northern highway. She had some difficulties with various government agencies, but completed it with support and lobbying efforts from the local business community.

Moraga also created smaller mosaics for local hotels, restaurants and homes. She also completed smaller public projects such as the benches on Francisco Rodriguez Street between Olas Altas and the Los Muertos pier.

=== Parque de los Azulejos ===
Moraga's previous work was created alone or with help from family and friends. Her next project (Parque de Azulejos) required better organization and fundraising.

The Parque de Azulejos (lit. "Tile Park") project began in 2017 and coincided with the 100th anniversary of the founding of Puerto Vallarta. It is located at Lázaro Cárdenas Park. Moraga stated: "I always passed by here and saw it dark, falling down and needing color." She presented the park project three times to the neighborhood association before it was approved. Moraga began with materials left over from previous projects as there was no funding for the project at first.

It is her largest project to date; she aims to cover everything in Lázaro Cárdenas Park in tile mosaics, including the entire 66-bench gazebo, the parking areas, barrier walls, and the flowerpots. The first phase of the project concentrated on the amphitheater, specifically the columns. It is estimated that when done, the park will have tiles and mirror pieces that, if lined up, would be over 1,000 meters (3,300 ft) long.

Moraga states that "all the colors and figures have meaning and are not arranged haphazardly." Most of the designs are characteristic to Puerto Vallarta, but some are more personal, such as those based on Moraga's tattoos.

The entire project is privately financed. To fund the project, Moraga turned to the sale of patronage tiles and other kinds of donations, including money raised via the project's website.

Most of the work is done by volunteers, who Moraga trains in three-day workshops, similar to the training she had in Philadelphia. Open to anyone interested, it has included children, teens, adults and senior citizens who have been involved in various parts of the creative process. As of 2019, Parque de Azulejos is 70% finished. A completion date has not been announced.

The project in the park caught the attention of locals and tourists and changed the surrounding neighborhood's image and led to it getting publicly serviced better.

=== Mozayko Vallarta ===
The Parque de Azulejos project marked a change of Moraga's projects to a community-focused and community-organized model. The basis of this model is Mozayko Vallarta, the first word a play on the Spanish word for tile, "mosaico". Three-day workshops are organized through this venue, training over 300 people as of January 2019. Money is raised through donations through a Facebook page as well as the sale of t-shirts and other items.

Moraga has been invited to speak about Mozayko Vallarta and its effects in the community in both Mexico and the United States. In 2019, she was recognized by the Asociación Mexicana de Mujeres Empresarias in the city for her community contributions.
