= Identidad =

Sculpture in Puerto Vallarta, Jalisco, Mexico

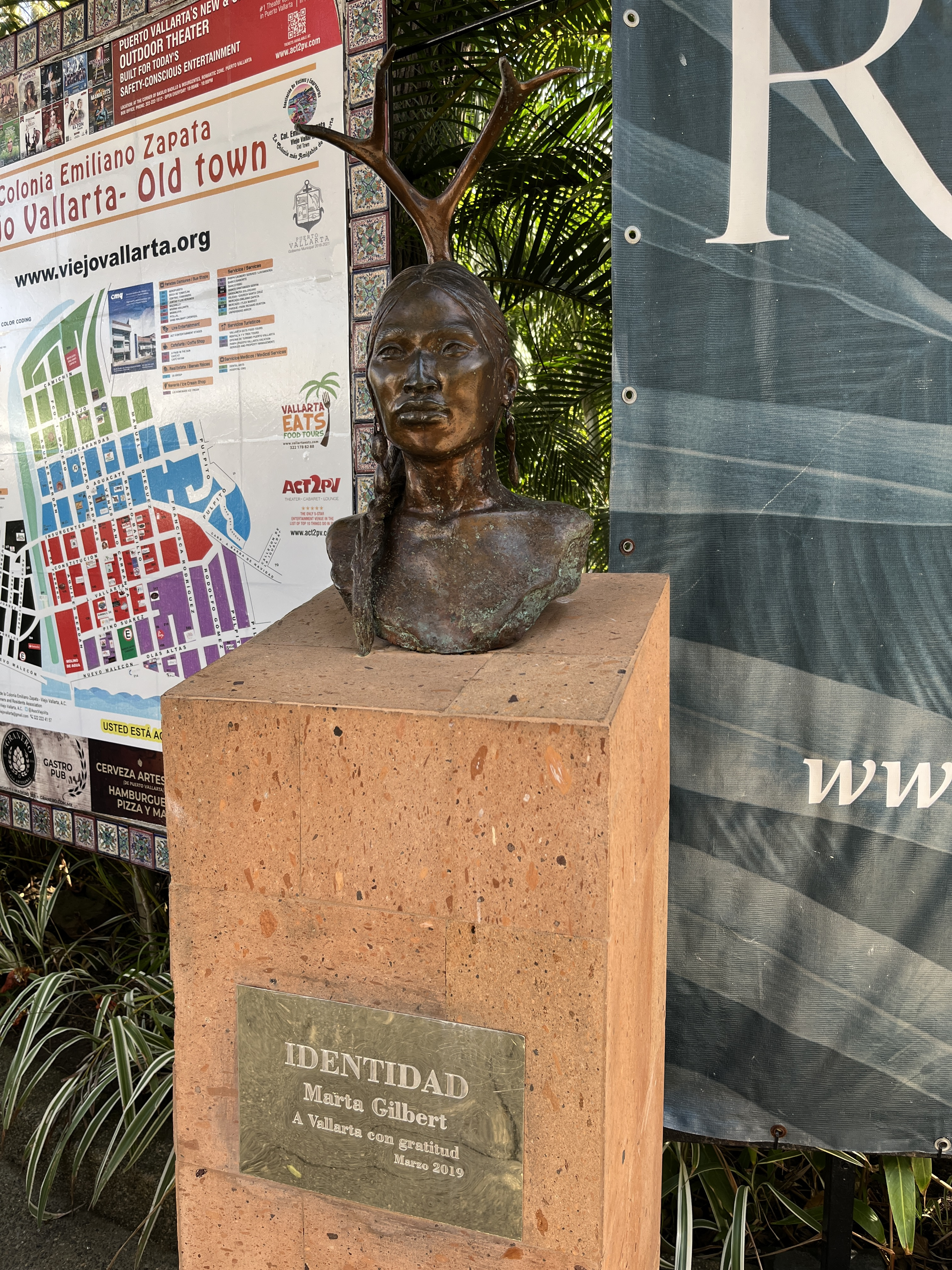
- The sculpture in 2023
- Artist: Marta Gilbert
- Year: 2019
- Location: Puerto Vallarta, Jalisco, Mexico

Identidad is a sculpture by Marta Gilbert, installed in Zona Romántica, Puerto Vallarta, in the Mexican state of Jalisco. Gilbert donated the bust to the city, which was unveiled in 2019.
