= Iglesia de la Santa Cruz (Puerto Vallarta) =

Church in Puerto Vallarta, Jalisco, Mexico

- Parroquia de la Santa Cruz
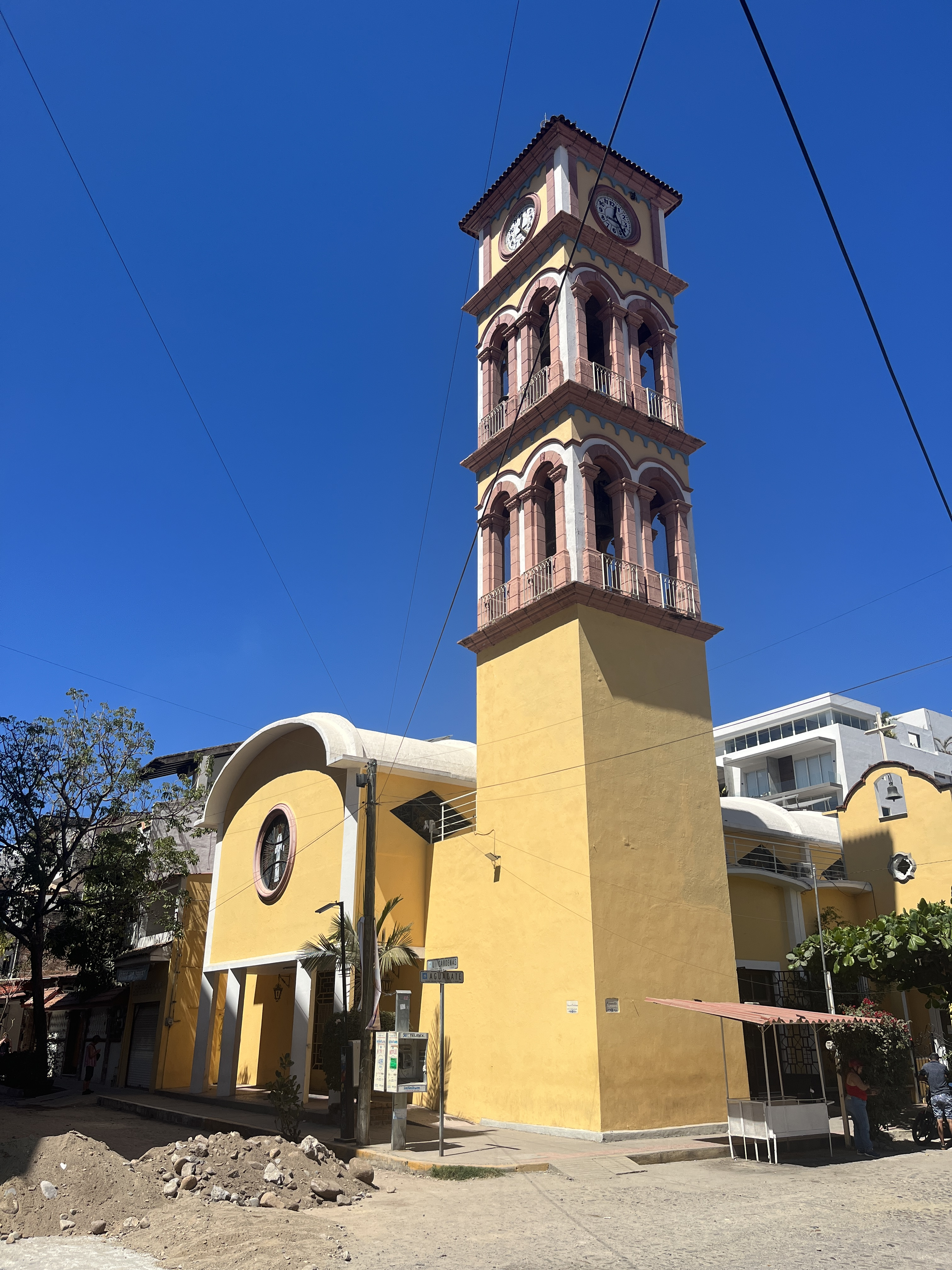
- The church's exterior in 2023
- Iglesia de la Santa Cruz
- 20.6042°N 105.2330°W
- Location: Zona Romántica, Puerto Vallarta, Jalisco
- Country: Mexico
- Denomination: Catholic

History
- Status: Parish church
- Dedication: Holy cross
- Dedicated: 3 May (Fiesta de las Cruces)

Clergy
- Priest: Esteban Salazar González

The Iglesia de la Santa Cruz is a parish church in Zona Romántica, Puerto Vallarta, in the Mexican state of Jalisco. It is dedicated to the holy cross, whose feast is on 3 May with a celebration named Fiesta de las Cruces. The holy cross is also the patron saint of the masons, who go on pilgrimage to the church on that day. The construction started in 1954.
