= Ándale Bernardo =

Sculpture in Puerto Vallarta, Jalisco, Mexico

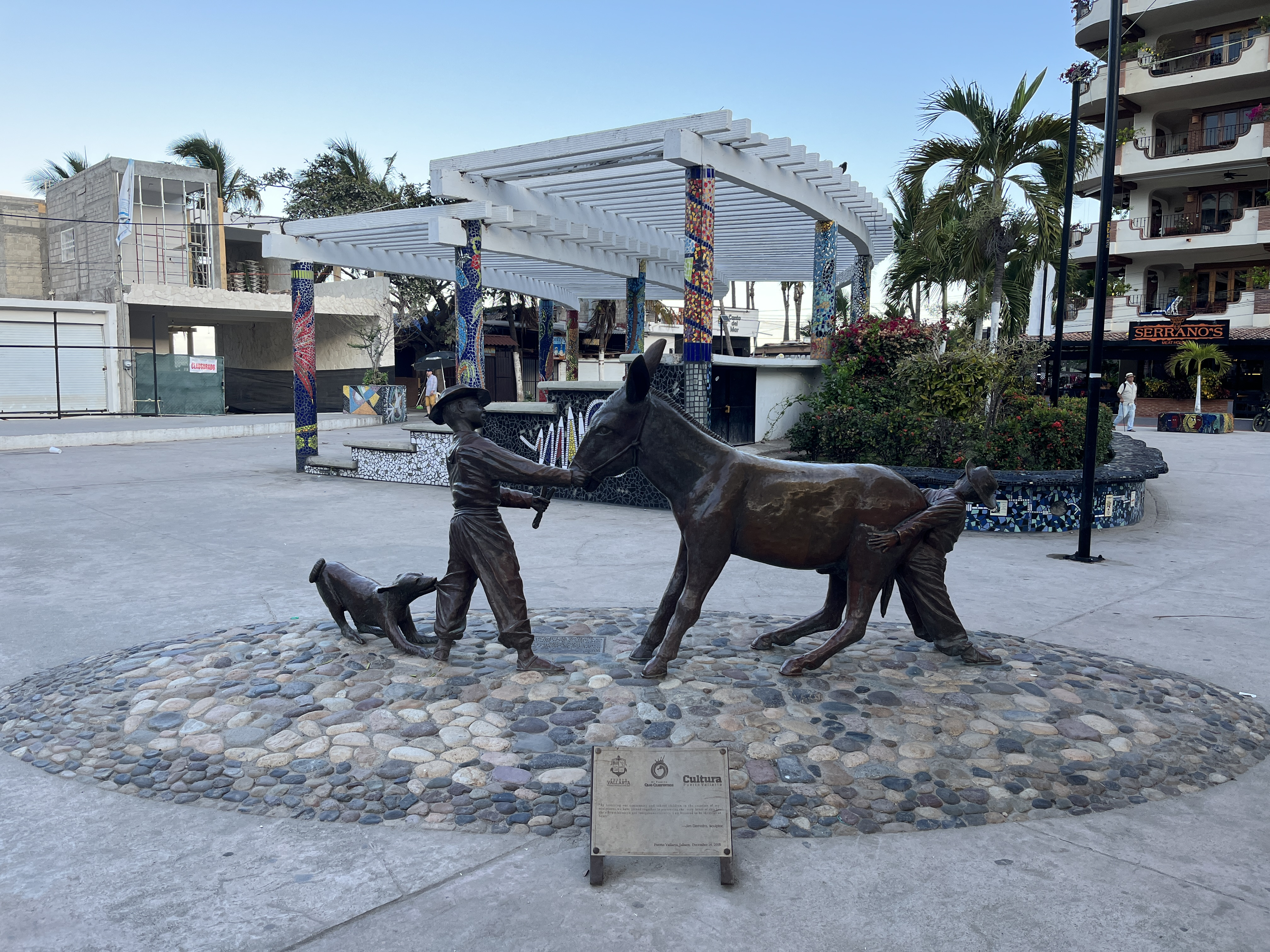
- The sculpture in 2023
- Artist: Jim Demetro
- Medium: Bronze sculpture
- Location: Puerto Vallarta, Jalisco, Mexico; 20°36′10.3″N 105°14′16.2″W

Ándale Bernardo is a bronze sculpture by Jim Demetro, installed in Puerto Vallarta's Lázaro Cárdenas Park, in the Mexican state of Jalisco. According to Banderas News, the artwork "honors all the workers, burros, residents, and visitors who make Puerto Vallarta such a wonderful place".
