= La Iglesia de Santa Cruz and Site of the Plaza of Santa Cruz de la Canada =

- U.S. National Register of Historic Places
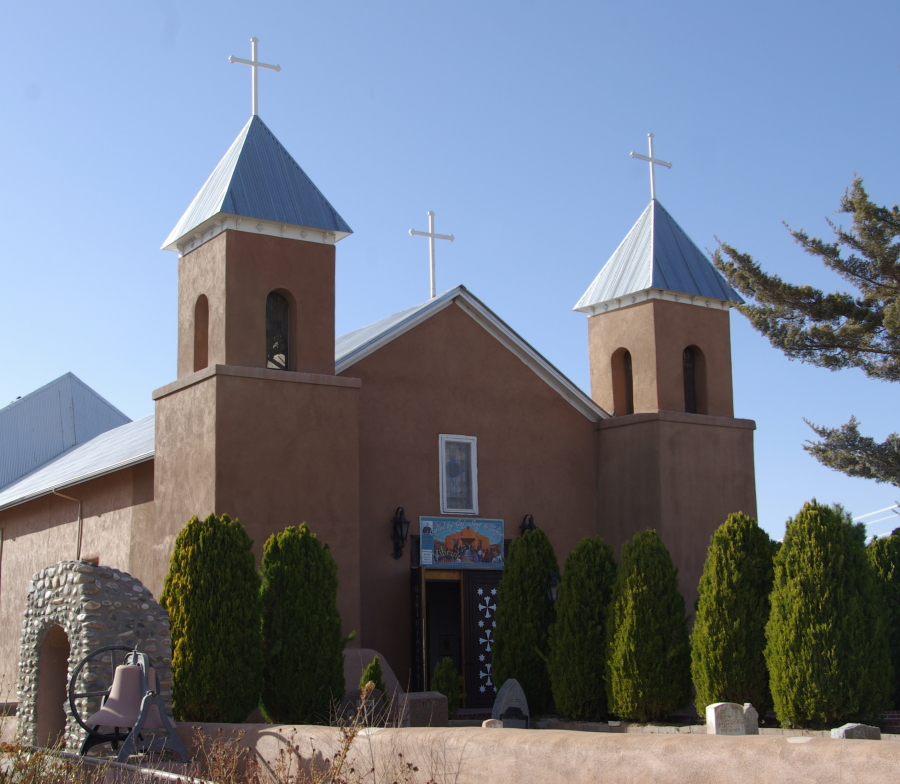
- The Holy Cross Roman Catholic Church, Santa Cruz, New Mexico.

- Location within New Mexico
- Location: 100 Block of Santa Cruz Plaza, Espanola, New Mexico
- Coordinates: 35°59′26″N 106°02′50″W
- Area: 5 acres (2.0 ha)
- Built: 1733
- Architectural style: New Mexico Vernacular
- NRHP reference No.: 73001148
- Added to NRHP: August 17, 1973

The district is a rectangular, open plaza with buildings on four sides. The most notable is the eighteenth-century La Iglesia de Santa Cruz. The plaza is also outlined on three sides and crossed diagonally by South McCurdy Road (New Mexico 583). Facing it are the church and four related features; four dwellings; one functioning and one nonfunctioning store; the Santa Cruz Irrigation District office; a vacant building; and three sites of former buildings, one in ruins. The Holy Cross Church, a Spanish-Colonial, adobe edifice dominates the west side. The ‘’Ortega House’’, a relatively large, contributing, New Mexico Vernacular building is on the south. To the east are three noncontributing dwellings and on the north three noncontributing buildings. Most of the buildings facing the plaza are cement plastered in an adobe shade of brown. The plaza itself and the principal buildings have retained architectural integrity and represent their historical associations. The buildings on the remaining two sides were built or altered after the Period of Significance. Sites of former buildings on the south and east sides contain varying potential for archaeological investigation.

The region on both sides of the Santa Cruz River was first settled in the 17th century by a number of ranches and haciendas scattered throughout the area. During the great Pueblo Revolt of 1680 the colonist fled or were killed by the neighboring Tewa Pueblo Indians. With the Spanish gone, the Tano Pueblos of San Lazaro and San Cristobal, formerly located in the Galisteo Basin, relocated at two sites opposite each other on the Santa Cruz River.

In 1695 General Diego de Vargas Zapata Lujan Ponce de Leon reoccupied the valley and ordered the Indians of these villages to move. The land was granted to sixty Spanish families brought to New Mexico by Fray Francisco Farfán in 1694. They settled ‘’La Villa Nueva de Santa Cruz de Los Españoles Mexicanos del Rey Nuestro Senor Carlos Segundo‘’ on April 21, 1695. In October, 44 families, from Zacatecas joined them. These settlers left the area by 1700 and were replaced by the New Mexico families from the old ranchos. In 1706, the village had a small church, but this structure proved to be inadequate and in June 1733, Governor Gervasio Cruzat y Gongora granted the inhabitants of Santa Cruz permission to build a new church.
