= Los Muertos Pier =

Pier in Puerto Vallarta, Jalisco, Mexico

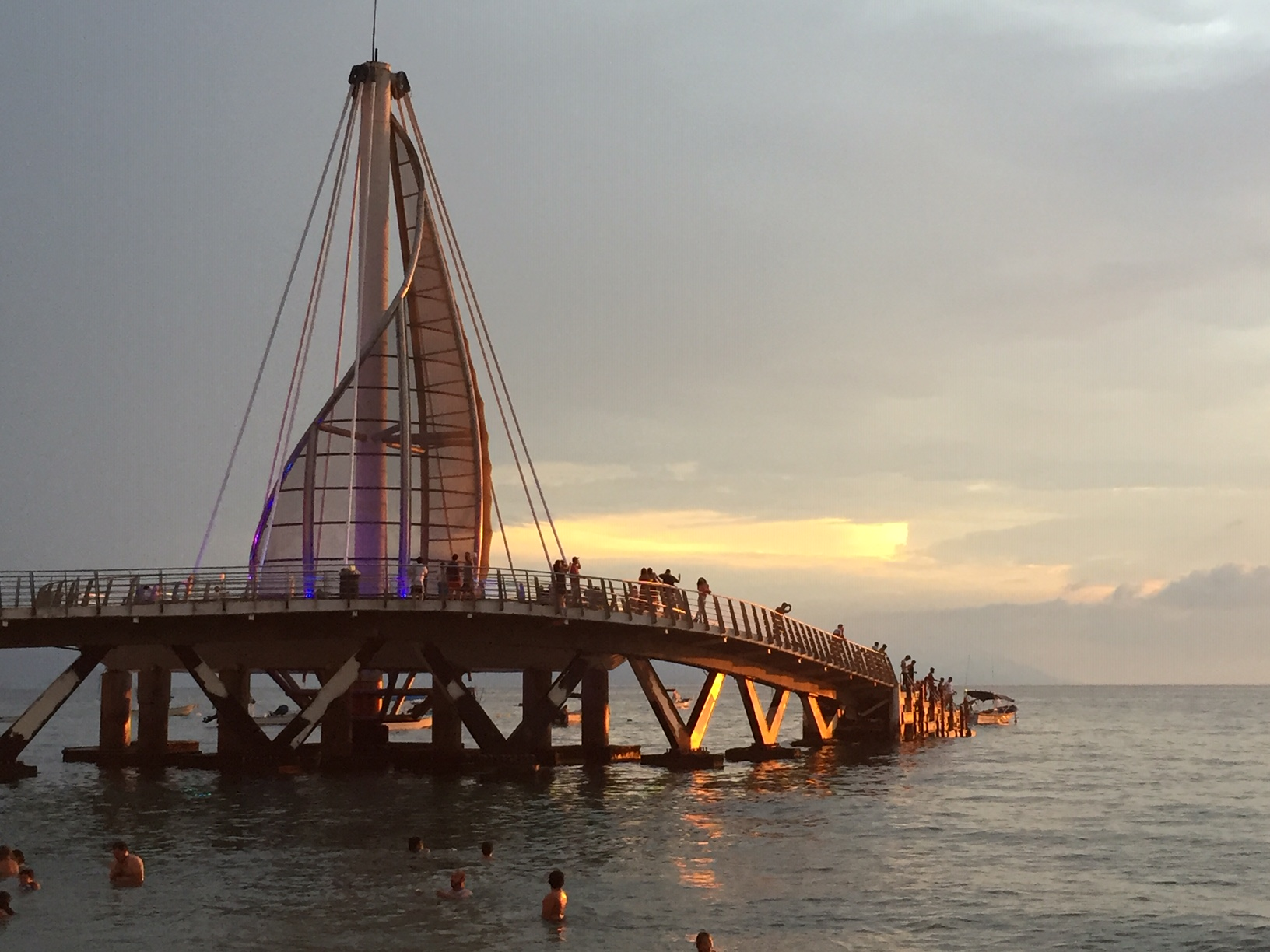
- The pier in 2016
- Location: Zona Romántica, Puerto Vallarta, Jalisco, Mexico
- Coordinates: 20°36′2″N 105°14′22″W

History
- Designer: José de Jesus Torres Vega
- Completion date: 2013

Los Muertos Pier is a pier along Playa de los Muertos in Puerto Vallarta's Zona Romántica, in the Mexican state of Jalisco. Completed in 2013, the structure replaced an older wooden pier. It offers views of the Bay of Banderas and features a central metal structure which resembles a ship's sail.

Designed by José de Jesus Torres Vega, the pier has been described as a symbol of the city.

== See also ==
- List of piers
