= Statue of Lázaro Cárdenas (Puerto Vallarta) =

Statue in Puerto Vallarta, Jalisco, Mexico

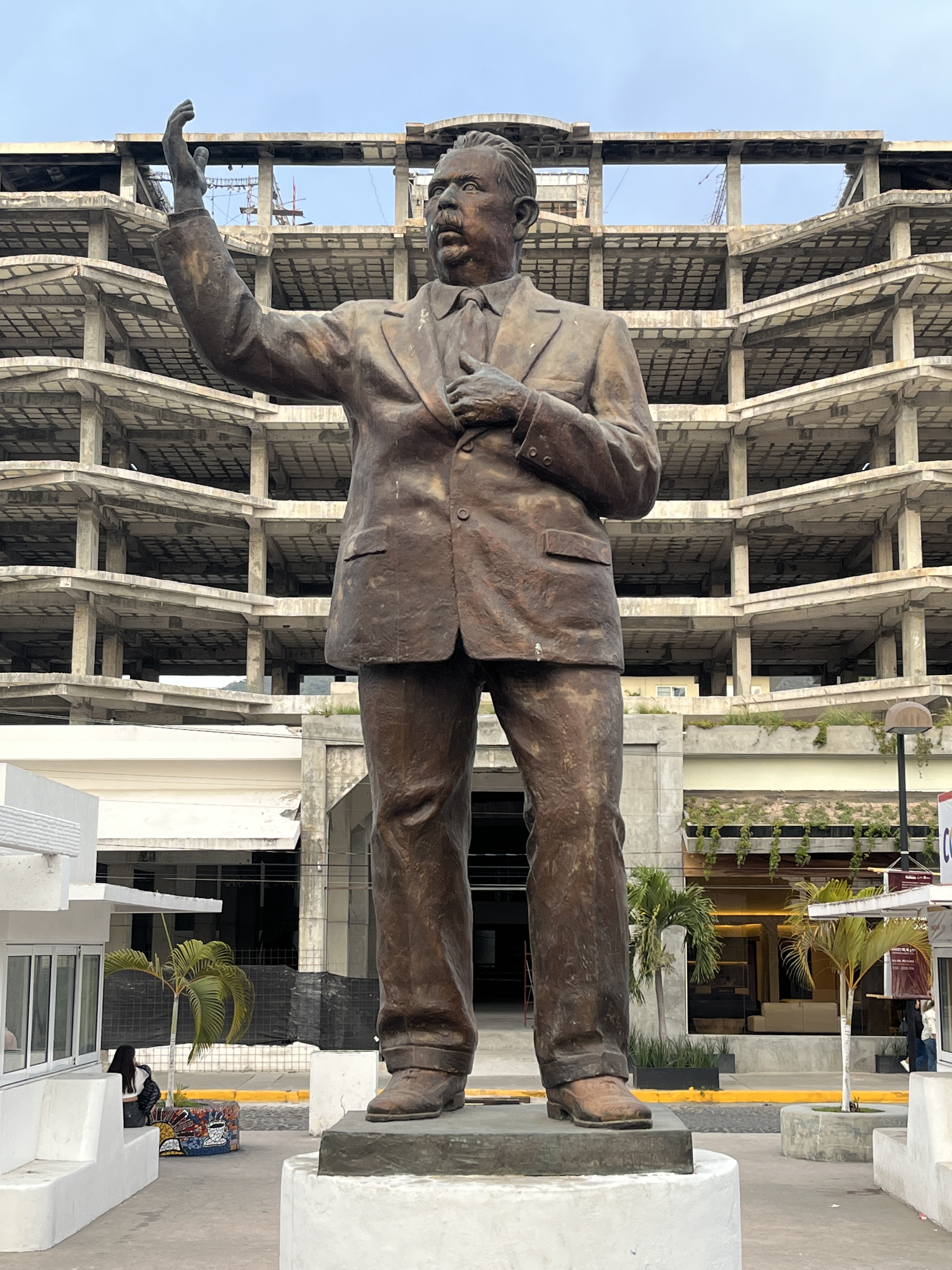
- The statue in 2023
- Year: 1970
- Medium: Bronze sculpture
- Subject: Lázaro Cárdenas
- Location: Puerto Vallarta, Jalisco, Mexico; 20°36′10.7″N 105°14′14.1″W

A bronze statue of Lázaro Cárdenas is installed in Puerto Vallarta's Lázaro Cárdenas Park, in the Mexican state of Jalisco. It was created by a group of students from the University of Michoacán and it was unveiled in 1970. As part of a municipal rehabilitation program, the statue was restored in 2020 and authorities decided to rotate it 180°.

== See also ==
- 1970 in art
- Statue of Lázaro Cárdenas (Madrid)
