= Blue Chairs Resort by the Sea =

Resort in Puerto Vallarta, Jalisco, Mexico

- Logo

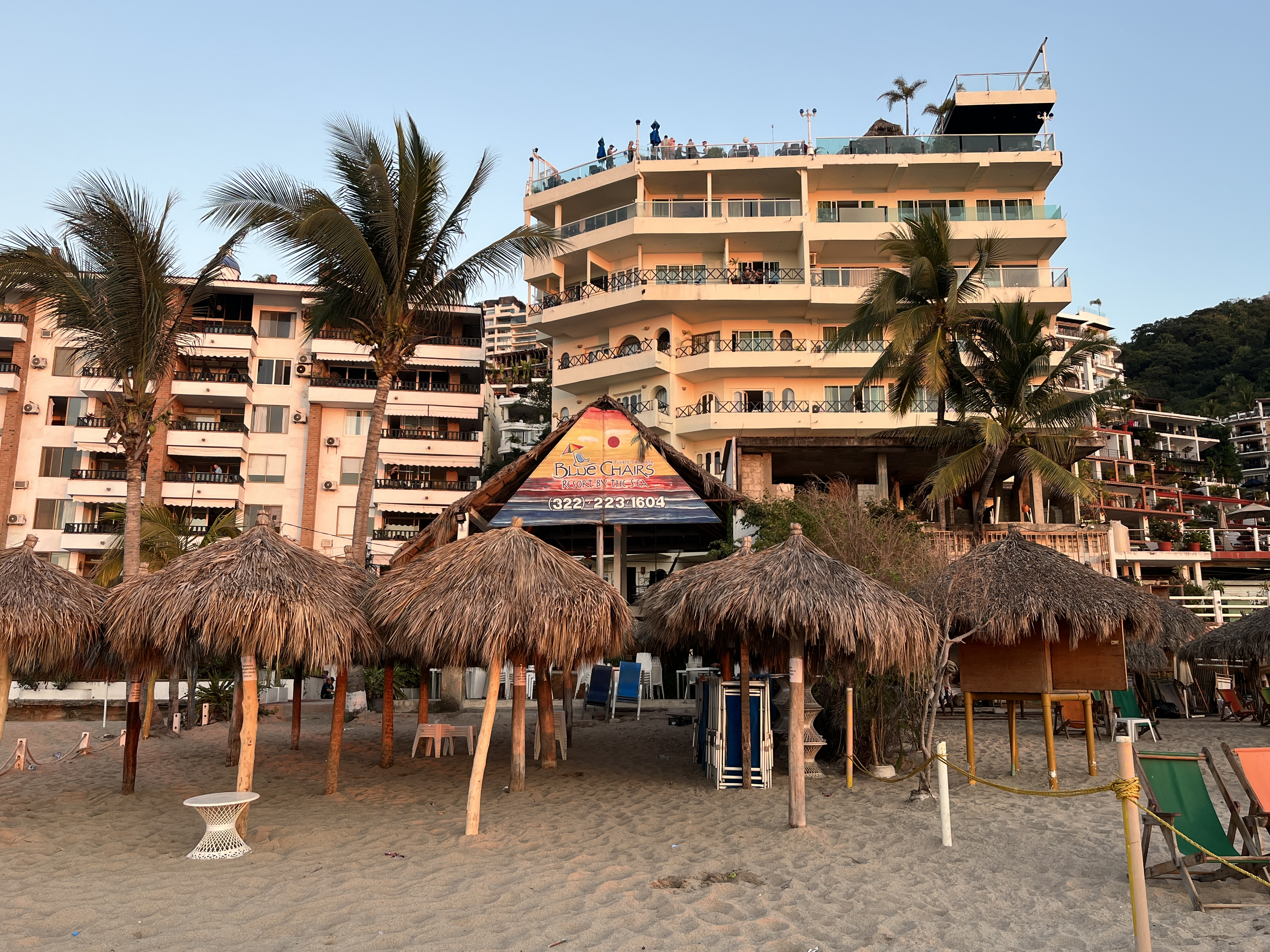
- The beach club in 2023
- Interactive map of the Blue Chairs Resort by the Sea area

General information
- Location: Malecón 4, Zona Romántica, Emiliano Zapata, 48380, Puerto Vallarta, Jalisco, Mexico
- Coordinates: 20.5973°N 105.2391°W

Website
- bluechairs.com

Blue Chairs Resort by the Sea (often simply Blue Chairs or sometimes Blue Chairs Beach Club), is an LGBTQ-friendly hotel in Puerto Vallarta's Zona Romántica, in the Mexican state of Jalisco. The property has a rooftop bar called Blue Sunset Rooftop Bar.

The beach in front of the hotel, the southern segment of Playa de los Muertos, is sometimes referred to as "Blue Chairs Beach". Blue Chairs Beach has been described as the "unofficially gay" portion of Playa de Los Muertos.

The hotel has hosted the Vallarta Pride Fashion Show.
