= Iglesia de la Santa Cruz (Inguanzo) =

- Iglesia de la Santa Cruz
- 43°18′32″N 4°51′58″W
- Location: Asturias, Spain

Iglesia de la Santa Cruz is a Roman Catholic church in Asturias, Spain. Its steeple has been closed to the public in recent years due to collapse fears. It is a small church; however, it is greatly attended during festivities by both locals and foreigners.

== History ==
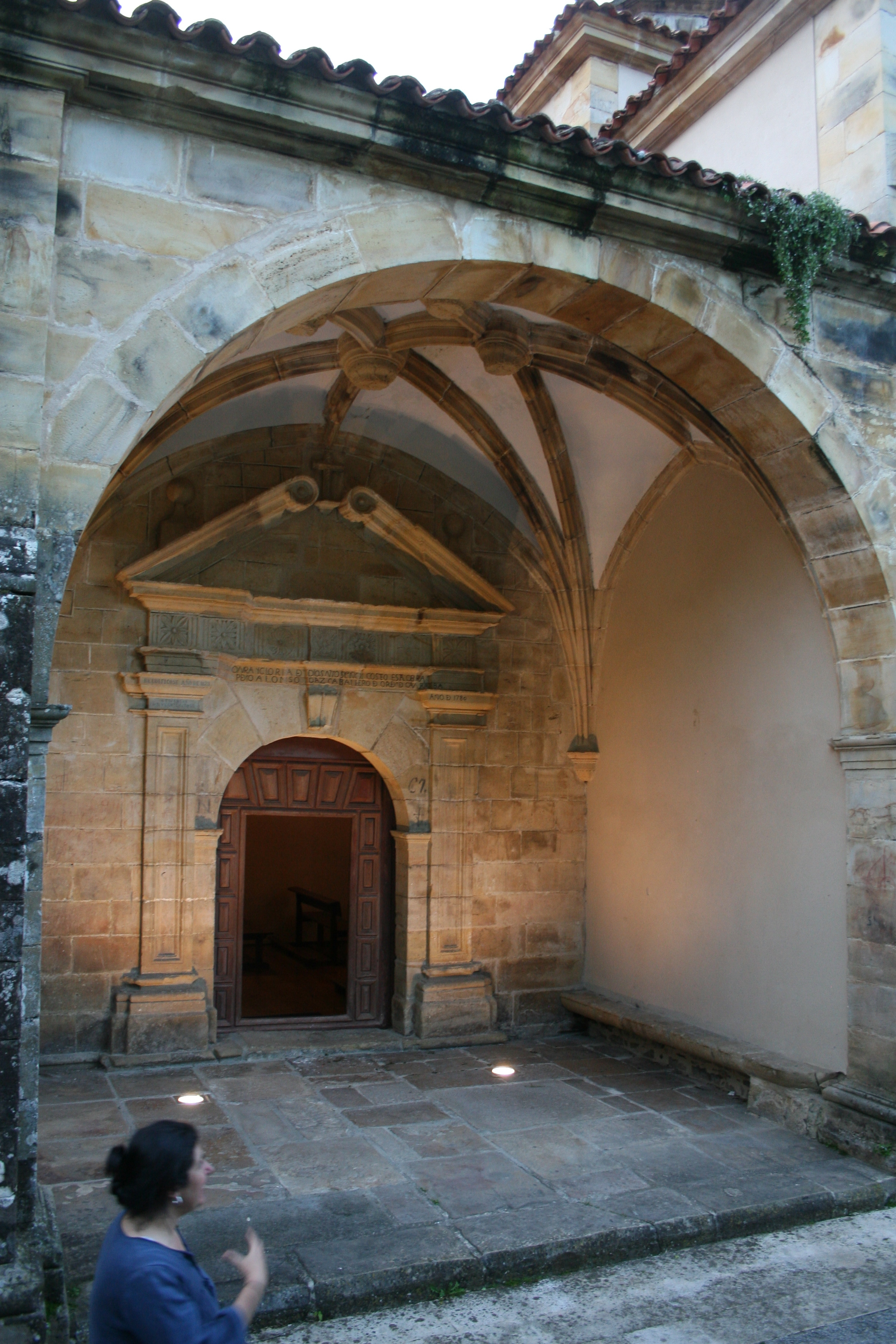
Iglesia de la Santa Cruz

It was commissioned in 1780 by Pedro de Alonso Día.

It was built in the 18th century, in the "Romantic" baroque style.

It is single storied with a dome topped with a Latin cross. It also possesses an annexed bell tower.

On 17 January the attendees honour Saint Anton, and on 3 May they honour the Holy Cross. They are featured celebrations in the Asturian calendar.

== See also ==
- Asturian art
- Catholic Church in Spain
- Churches in Asturias
- List of oldest church buildings
