= Iglesia de la Santa Cruz (Cangas de Onís) =

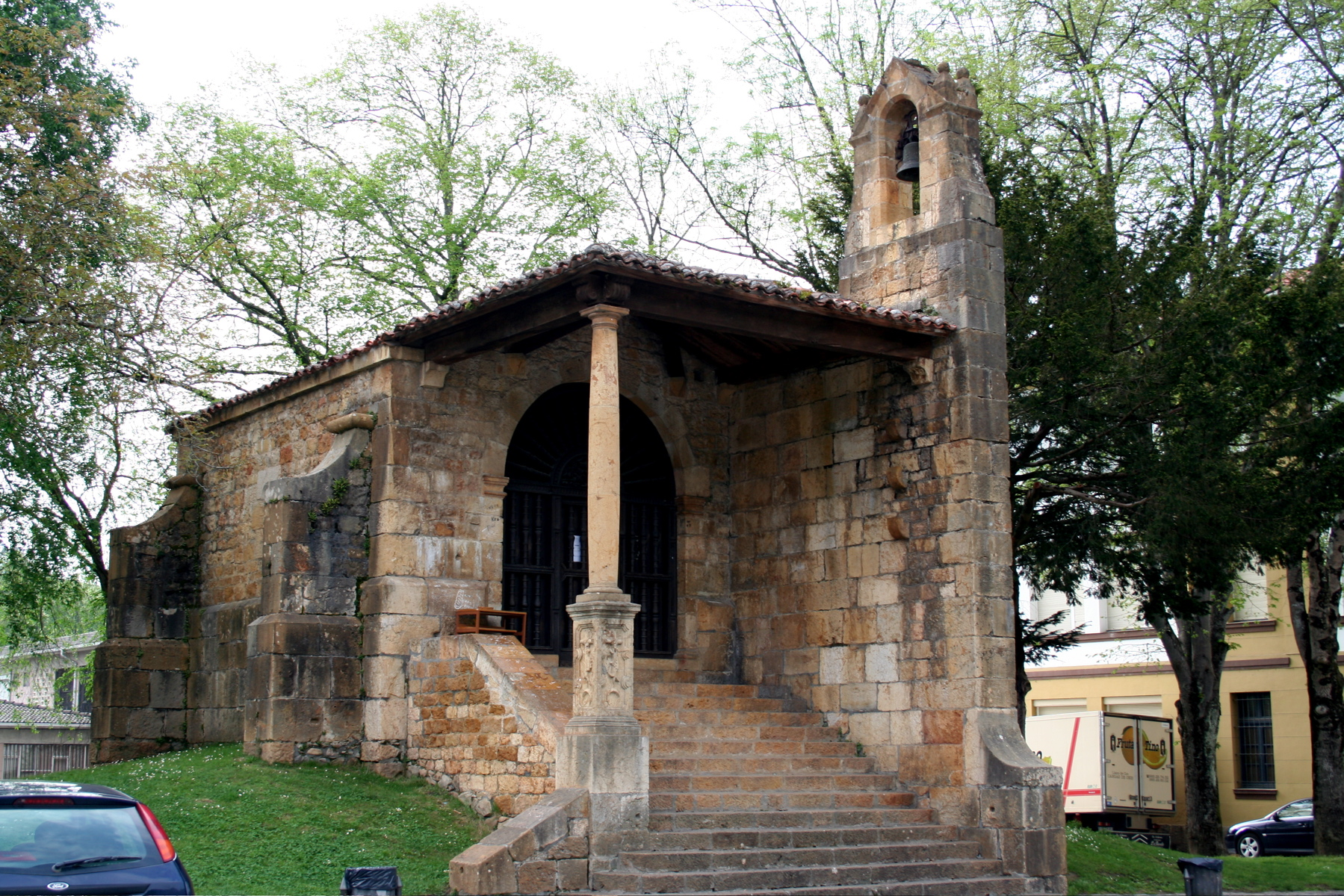
- Location: Asturias, Spain

Santa Cruz is a Pre-Romanesque Roman Catholic church located in Cangas de Onís, in Asturias, Spain.

The present church is the result of many modifications (in 1632 and in 1950 after destruction during the Spanish Civil War) to the original 8th-century structure in which, according to legend, the church's patrons Favila of Asturias and his wife Froiluba are buried. Favila was the heir to the throne held by Pelagius (Pelayo) of Asturias.

Putatively, the church once held the battle cross of Pelayo, called the Cruz de la Victoria. During the later reconstructions, a plaque (dating from 737) detailing the foundation was left visible. The text reads "here were consecrated altars to Christ by the priest Asterion on the day 300 of the year, during the sixth age of the world, during the era 775" (October 27, 737).

== See also ==
- Asturian art
- Catholic Church in Spain
- Churches in Asturias
- List of oldest church buildings
