= Mantamar Beach Club Bar & Sushi =

LGBT establishment in Puerto Vallarta, Mexico

- Logo

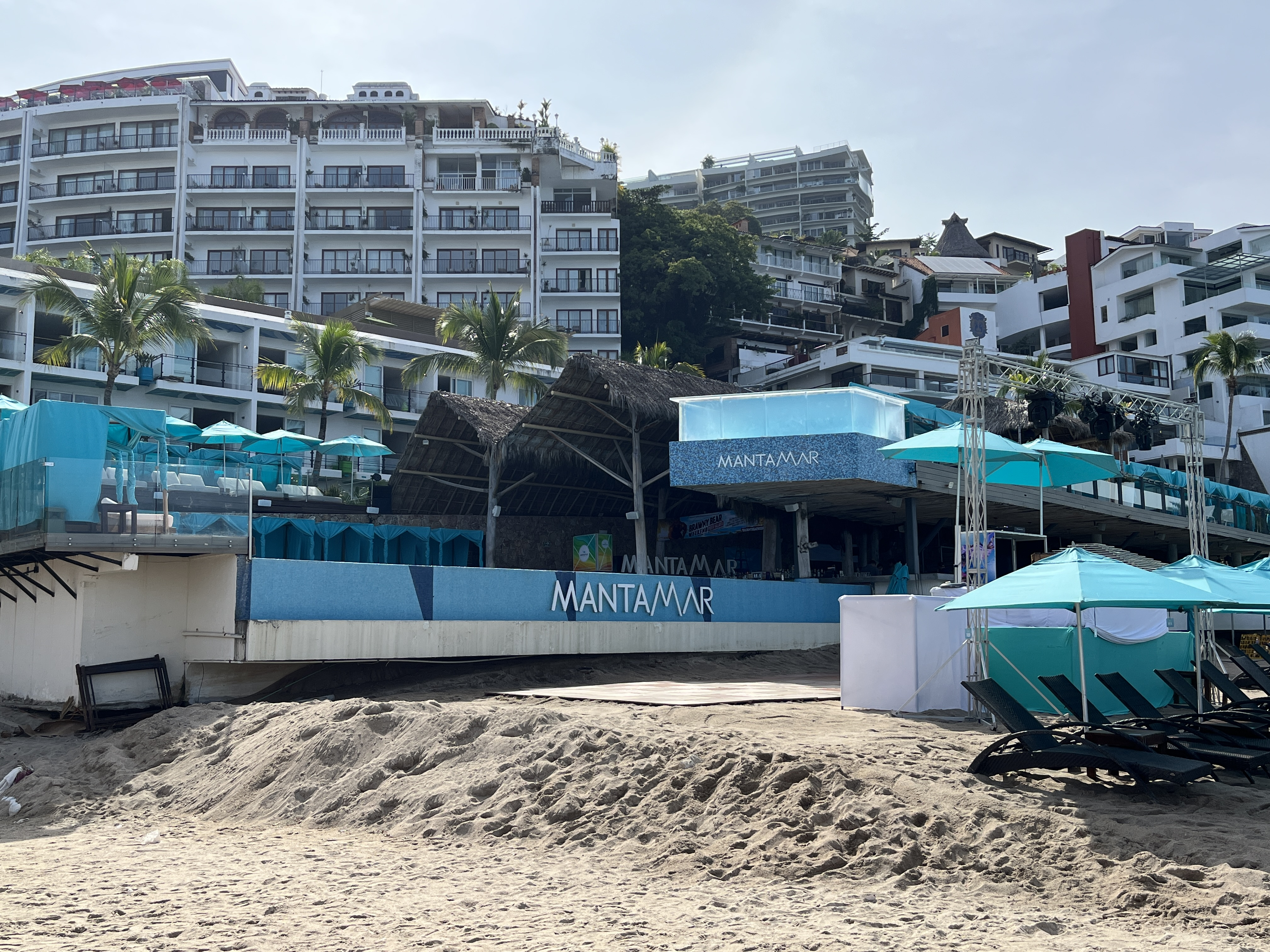
- 2022
- Interactive map of Mantamar Beach Club Bar & Sushi
- Former names: Mantamar Beach Club Bar & Grill
- Address: Puerto Vallarta; Mexico
- Coordinates: 20°35′47.5″N 105°14′23″W

Mantamar Beach Club Bar & Sushi (formerly Mantamar Beach Club Bar & Grill) is an LGBTQ bar in Puerto Vallarta's Zona Romántica, in the Mexican state of Jalisco.

== Description and history ==
Mantamar is a beach club associated with Almar Resort, an LGBT resort in Zona Romántica, Puerto Vallarta. The club opened c. 2013. Owned by Vidal Meza and Javier Jiménez, the bar was set ablaze, possibly by arson, shortly after opening. In 2020, Amy Ashenden of PinkNews said Mantamar "is the go-to place for – mostly – gay men", writing, "Although I spotted one small group of lesbians and they do occasionally throw lesbian parties in low season, it's definitely geared towards gay men looking to party".

In 2020, the establishment was fined after a video of patrons having sex in the pool went viral. The White Party Weekend in 2021 was canceled because of the COVID-19 pandemic.

== See also ==
- LGBT culture in Mexico
- List of LGBTQ bars
