= List of restaurants in Mexico =

This is a list of notable restaurants in Mexico. A restaurant is a business which prepares and serves food and drink to customers in return for money, either paid before the meal, after the meal, or with an open account.

== Restaurants in Mexico ==
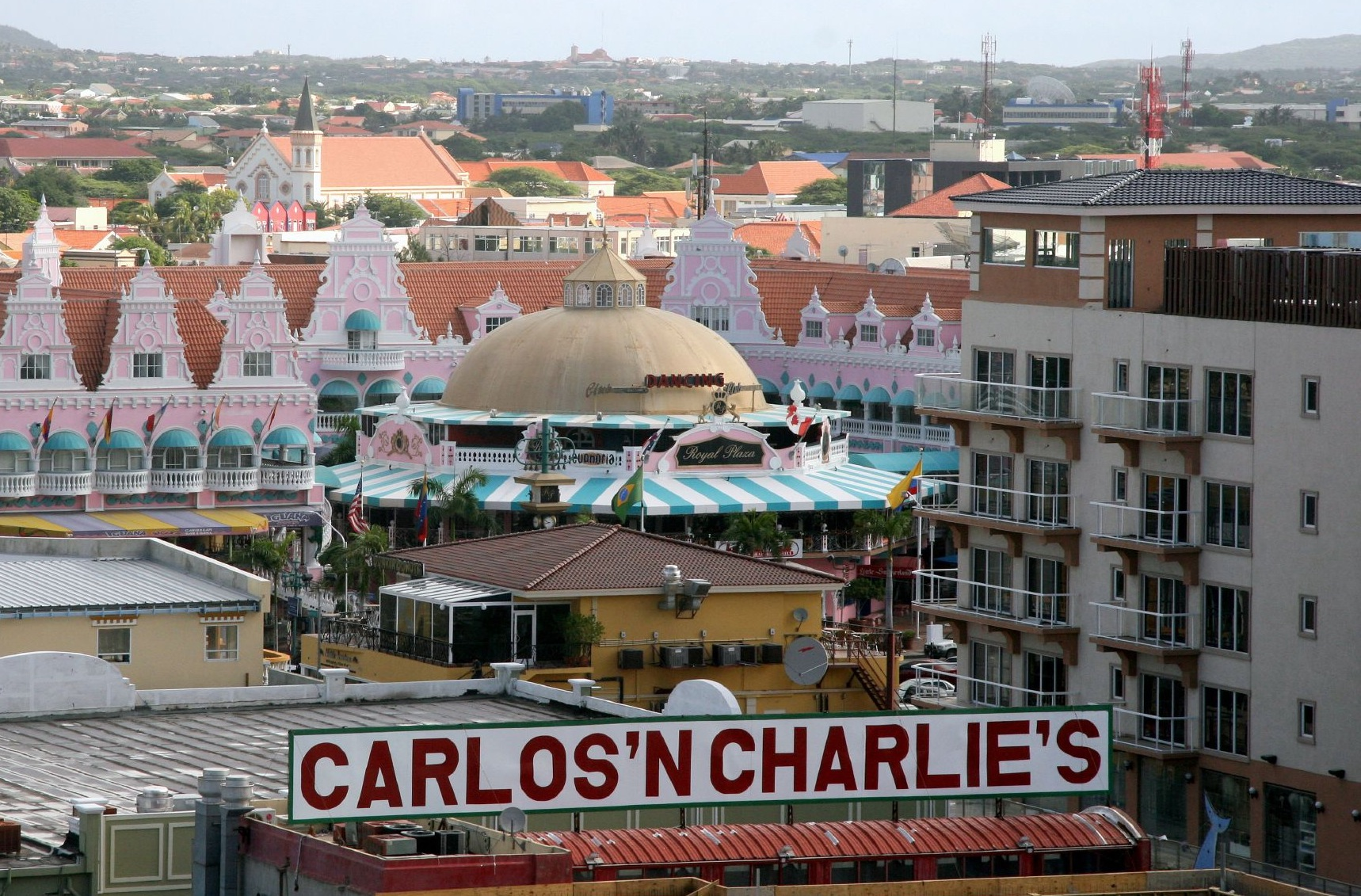
The former Carlos'n Charlie's in Oranjestad, Aruba

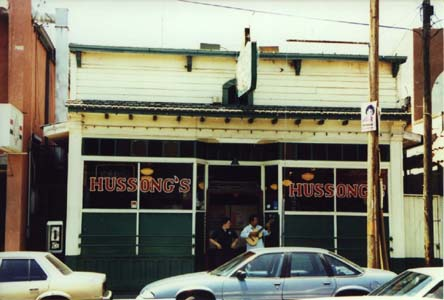
Hussong's in 1999

- Andale's Restaurant & Bar, Puerto Vallarta
- Archie's Wok, Puerto Vallarta
- Le Bistro, Puerto Vallarta
- The Blue Shrimp, Puerto Vallarta
- Cafe de Olla
- Café des Artistes, Puerto Vallarta
- Coco's Kitchen, Puerto Vallarta
- El Dorado, Puerto Vallarta
- Fredy's Tucan, Puerto Vallarta
- Grupo Anderson's
- Grupo Sanborns
- Hussong's
- ICÚ
- Kaiser Maximilian, Puerto Vallarta
- La Gruta, Teotihuacan
- La Palapa, Puerto Vallarta
- Le Kliff
- Los Muertos Brewing, Puerto Vallarta
- The Pancake House, Puerto Vallarta
- Restaurante Arroyo
- Ritmos Beach Cafe, Puerto Vallarta
- River Cafe, Puerto Vallarta
- Tintoque, Puerto Vallarta
- Toks

=== Mexico City ===
There are approximately 15,000 restaurants in Mexico City. Notable ones include:

- Alsea – based in Mexico City
- Biko – specializes in Basque cuisine
- Pujol
- San Ángel Inn – old Carmelite monastery which was turned into a well-known restaurant

== See also ==
- List of Mexican restaurants
- List of Michelin-starred restaurants in Mexico
- List of Michelin Bib Gourmand restaurants in Mexico
- Lists of restaurants
- Mexican cuisine
