= Le Bistro =

Restaurant in Puerto Vallarta, Jalisco, Mexico

Le Bistro Jazz Café
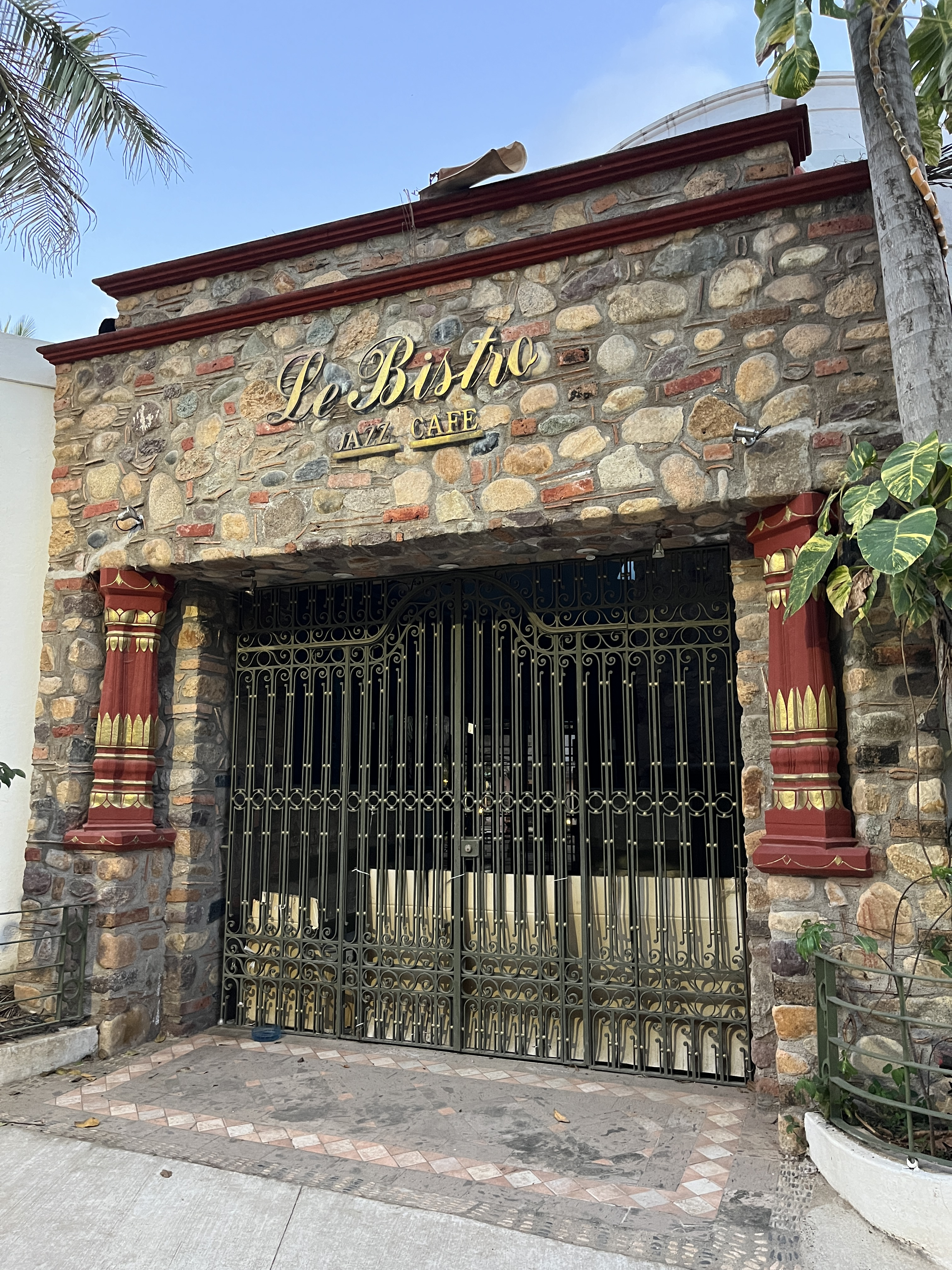
- The restaurant's exterior, 2023

Restaurant information
- Location: Puerto Vallarta, Jalisco, Mexico

Le Bistro Jazz Café, or simply Le Bistro, is a restaurant in Puerto Vallarta, Jalisco, Mexico.

== Description ==
The restaurant Le Bistro operates along Avenida Insurgentes on Isla Cuale, an island in the Cuale River in Puerto Vallarta's Zona Romántica neighborhood. It has a garden next to the statue of John Huston at the entrance. Le Bistro plays recorded as well as live jazz, with a collection of approximately 1,000 albums. The interior has also had wicker settees, chairs with zebra print, an Art Deco black-and-white tiled bar, and marble-topped bistro tables.

Fodor's described Le Bistro as "lush, riverside setting with cool jazz" where "Greco-Roman meets the tropics modern". One guide by Moon Publications says, "The atmosphere is European and elegant."

The restaurant serves shrimps, crepes, tampiqueña (marinated beef), seafood, filet mignon with mushrooms and a baked potato, as well as coconut shrimp tempura and wine. Other menu options have included shish kebabs, Cuban and Mexican soups, duck with blackberry sauce, Cornish game hen, and sea scallops with jicama coleslaw.

== Reception ==
A guide published by Moon recommended the roles supremo as an appetizer, as well as the chicken crepes. The Rough Guide to Mexico said, "[Le Bistro is] on the expensive side, but is a great place to wind down." Fodor's has called Le Bistro "a long-standing favorite" and has said the business "may be the chicest restaurant in town".

== See also ==
- List of restaurants in Mexico
- List of seafood restaurants
