= River Cafe =

River Cafe may refer to:

- The River Café (Brooklyn), New York, United States
- River Cafe (Puerto Vallarta), Jalisco, Mexico
- The River Cafe (London), United Kingdom
