= Puente Río Cuale =

Bridge in Puerto Vallarta, Jalisco, Mexico

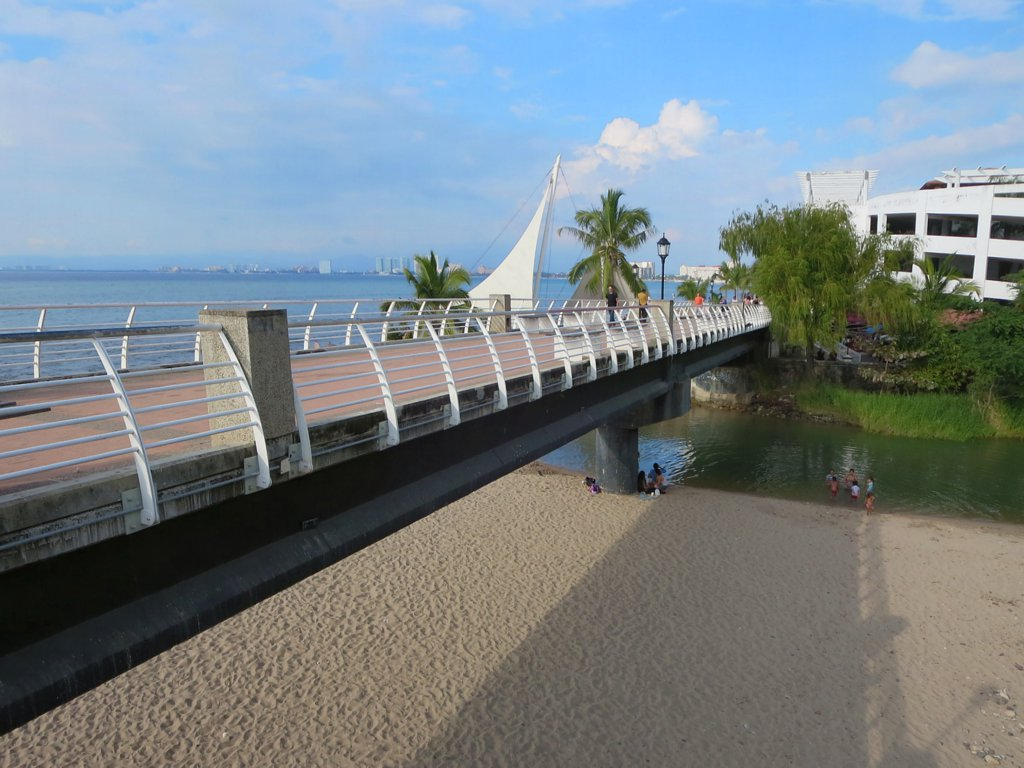
- The bridge in 2014
- Coordinates: 20.6060°N 105.2379°W
- Locale: Puerto Vallarta, Jalisco, Mexico

Puente Río Cuale is a bridge along Puerto Vallarta's Malecón, spanning the Cuale River and connecting the city's Centro and Zona Romántica neighborhoods. The bridge also provides access to Isla Cuale.

== See also ==
- List of bridges in Mexico
