= La Gruta =

Restaurant in Mexico

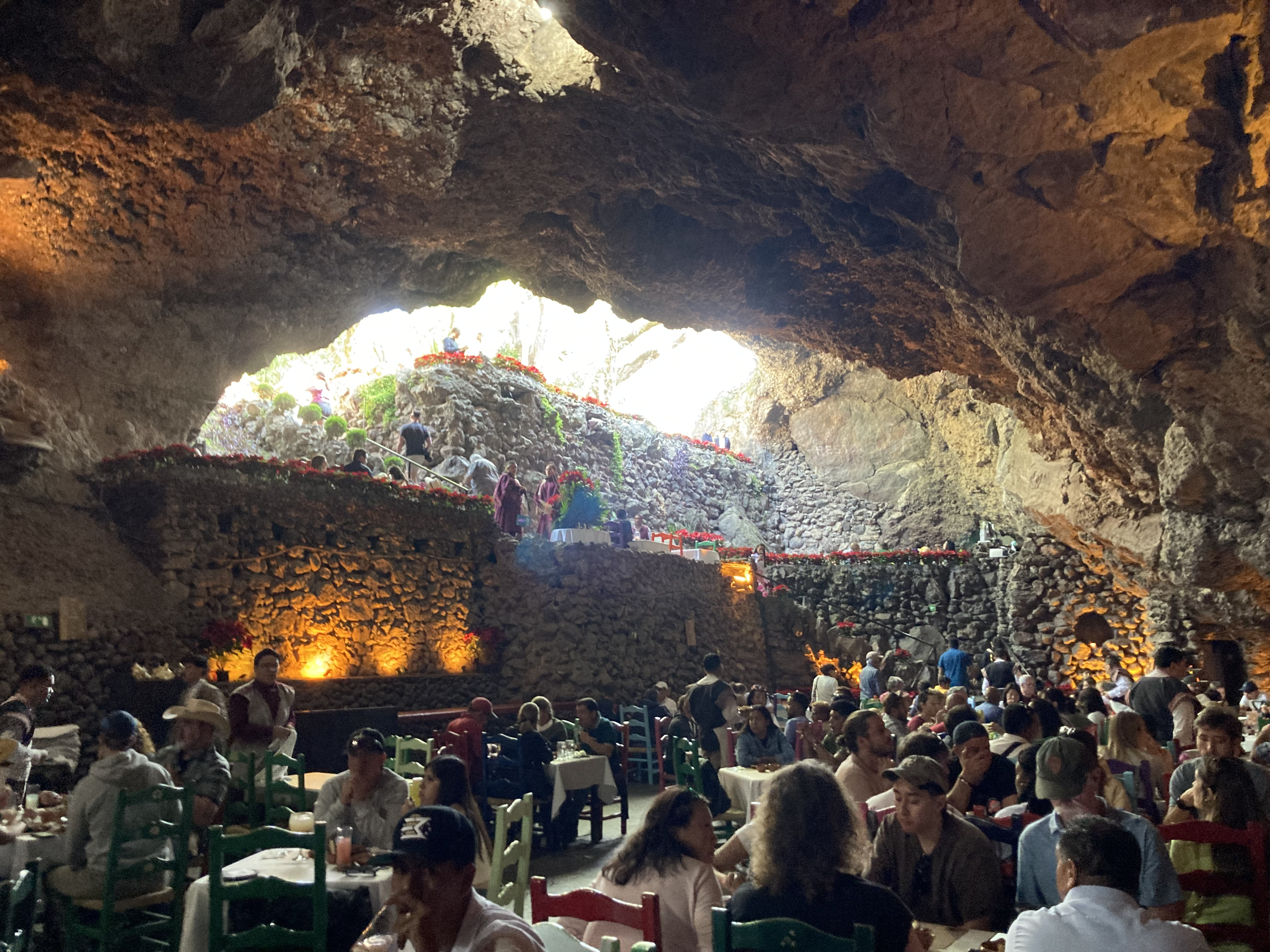
- The restaurant interior in 2024

- Location within State of Mexico Location within Mexico

Restaurant information
- Established: 1926
- Food type: Mexican (pre-Hispanic-influenced)
- Location: Circuito Arqueológico, Av. del Puente s/n, San Francisco Mazapa, 55820 San Juan Teotihuacán, México
- Coordinates: 19.6889°N 98.8395°W
- Website: www.lagruta.mx

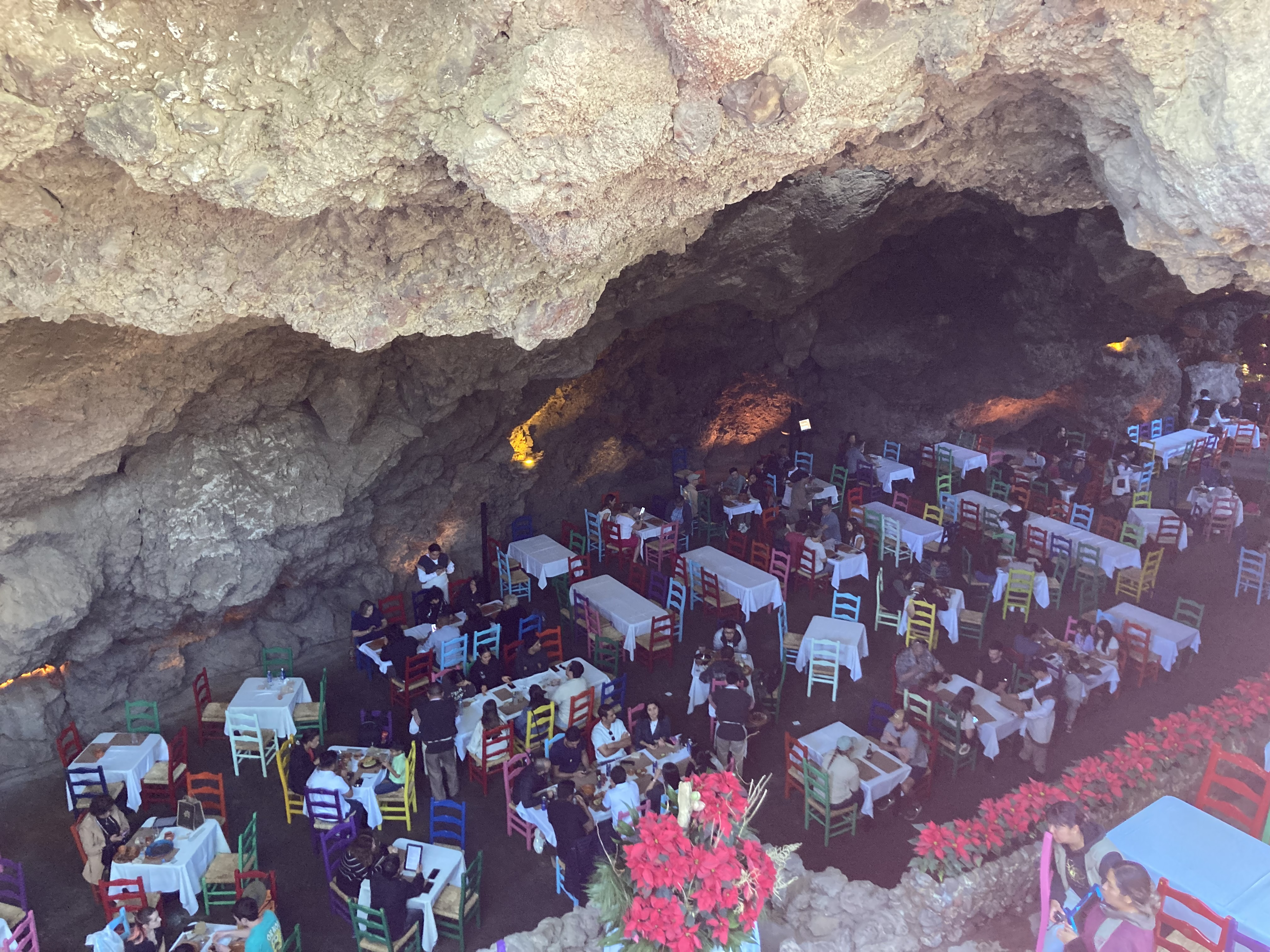
Interior of the cave

La Gruta (Spanish for "The Grotto") is a Mexican restaurant located inside a natural volcanic cave in San Juan Teotihuacán Municipality, State of Mexico, adjacent to the Teotihuacan archaeological zone. The cave was used for private banquets hosted by President Porfirio Díaz during the early-twentieth-century archaeological rescue of Teotihuacán, beginning on 9 April 1906. It opened as a public restaurant in 1926 and serves Mexican cuisine drawing on the pre-Hispanic culinary tradition of central Mexico.

== History ==
=== Geological setting and pre-Hispanic use ===
The cave is a natural cavity of volcanic origin, formed by activity of the Cerro Gordo and Patlachique volcanic complex. During the apogee of the city of Teotihuacán (approximately 100 BCE – 650 CE), the cavity is reported to have been used by the city's inhabitants to store maize and other grains.

=== Establishment as a restaurant ===
The cave was used during the Leopoldo Batres-led archaeological rescue of Teotihuacán, which Porfirio Díaz had commissioned in preparation for the 1910 centennial of Mexican independence and which culminated in the formal opening of the archaeological zone on 13 September 1910. Díaz held private banquets in the cave for diplomatic delegations beginning on 9 April 1906. Between 1910 and 1926, the space continued to be used for banquets and special events.

In 1926, Filiberto Cedillo, then manager of the Hotel Regis in Mexico City, acquired the cave and, together with his wife Asunción Arce, opened it as a public restaurant.

== Description ==
La Gruta is located approximately 200 metres (660 ft) from Gate 5 of the Teotihuacán archaeological zone, behind the Pyramid of the Sun. The cave's seating capacity has been reported as between 500 and 700 diners. Daytime light enters through openings in the upper part of the cavity; in the evenings, the space is illuminated by candles. The cave maintains a constant interior temperature substantially below that of the surface.

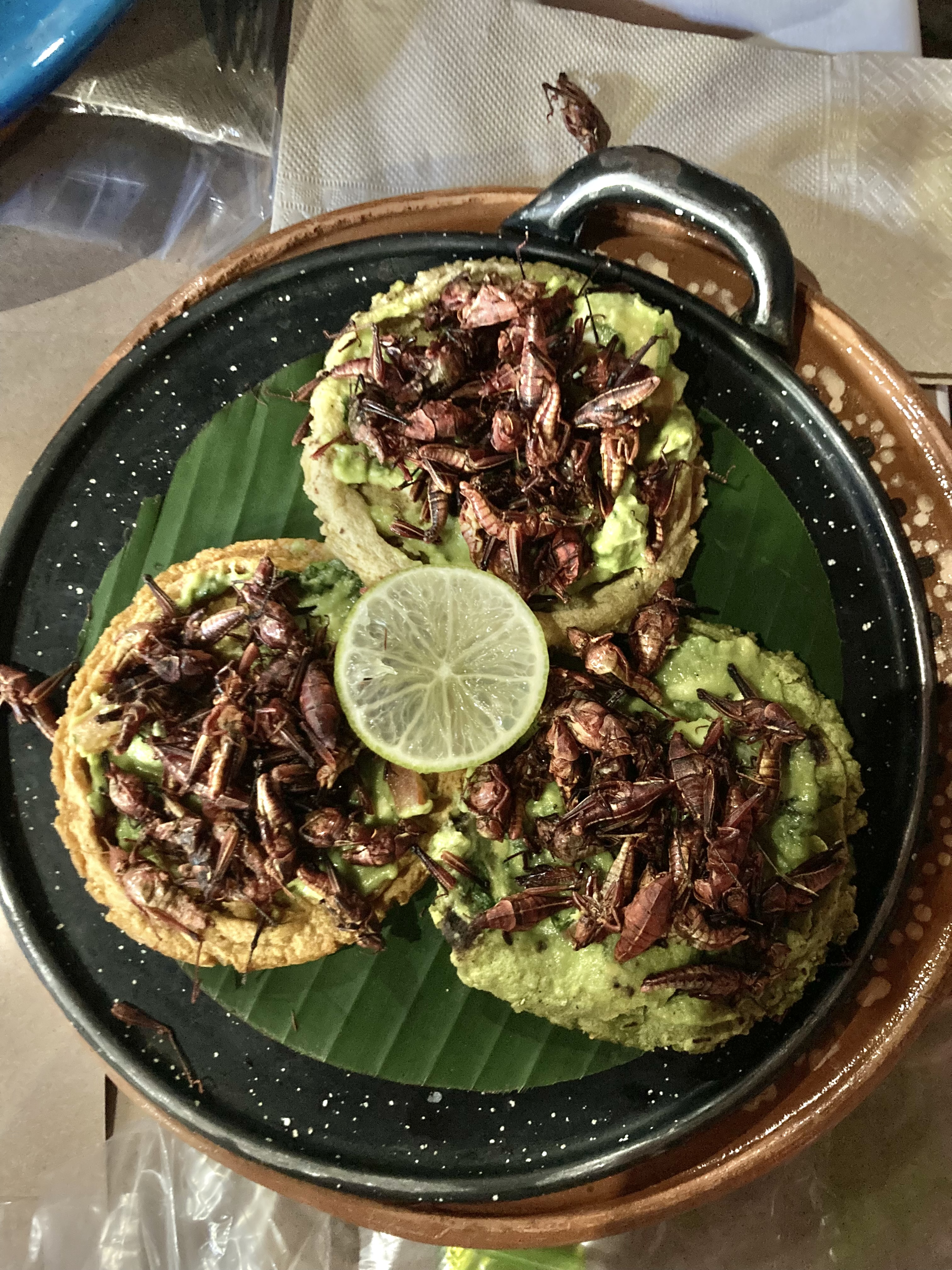
A grasshopper figure at the restaurant

The restaurant serves dishes drawn from Mexican and central Mexican pre-Hispanic culinary traditions, including tlacoyos, quesadillas, escamoles, maguey worms, tortilla soup, corn soup, mushroom and nopal soup, sopa de fideo, barbacoa, mixiote, and various preparations of mole, including a house mole created in 1927. Margaritas are prepared with xoconostle or with the fruit of the prickly pear. The restaurant operates an in-house garden and grows much of its own produce.

At the conclusion of a meal, diners are presented with a candle; lighting it and placing it on the cave wall is described as a symbol of rebirth, drawing on Mesoamerican cosmological associations between caves and the underworld. Mexican folk dances and pre-Hispanic dance performances are staged on weekends.

La Gruta has been associated with numerous notable diners since the early twentieth century. Porfirio Díaz hosted banquets in the cave during the rescue of Teotihuacán, beginning in 1906. Elizabeth II is reported to have dined at the restaurant during her state visit to Mexico in 1975. The members of the South Korean group BTS visited the restaurant in October 2014 during their participation in the KBS Music Bank in Mexico broadcast; member Jimin documented the visit on the group's official blog. Other figures the restaurant lists among its notable diners include Emiliano Zapata, Frida Kahlo, Diego Rivera, Octavio Paz, Jorge Luis Borges, María Félix, and Akihito.

=== Sustainability and producer programs ===
La Gruta works with the International Maize and Wheat Improvement Center (CIMMYT) on a maize-supply program for native Mexican maize varieties grown in the Teotihuacán Valley, known as the Proyecto Teot, launched in 2017. Through the program, the restaurant purchases native white, yellow, blue, and red maize directly from smallholder farmers in surrounding communities, with technical assistance and post-harvest infrastructure provided in coordination with CIMMYT. All masa used at the restaurant is nixtamalized on-site from native maize.

The restaurant has reported additional sustainability practices, including segregation and recycling of solid waste, conversion of used cooking oil to biodiesel, in-house cultivation of heirloom tomato varieties, and sourcing of textiles from Mazahua artisans for staff uniforms. In 2025, La Gruta received the Sustainability Award (Premio a la Sustentabilidad) at the Premios Gastrolab, organized by the Mexican gastronomy publication Gastrolab.
