= Café de Olla =

Restaurant in Puerto Vallarta, Jalisco, Mexico

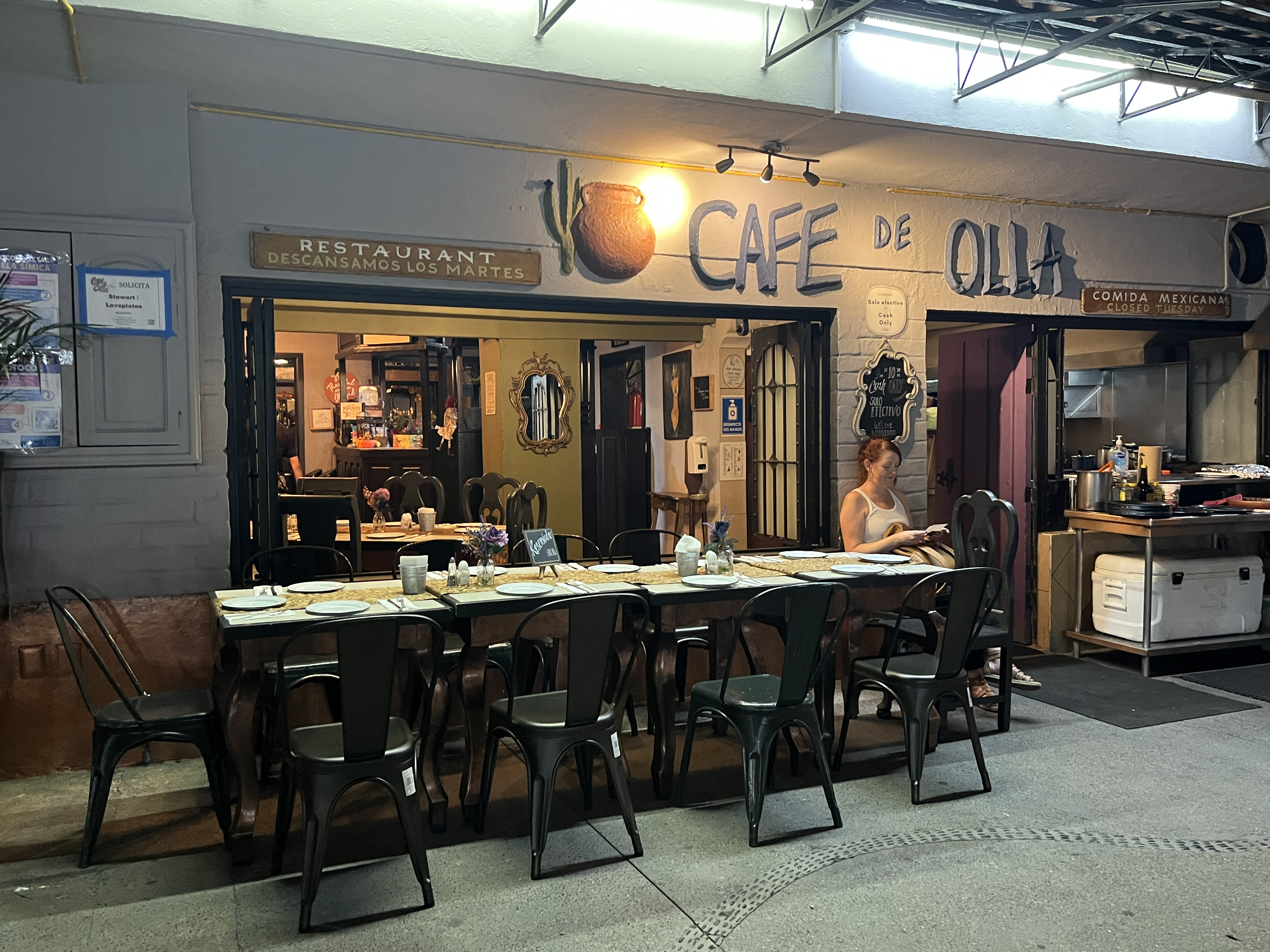
- The restaurant's exterior, 2022
- Interactive map of Café de Olla

Restaurant information
- Food type: Mexican
- Location: Basilio Badillo 168, Puerto Vallarta, Jalisco, Mexico
- Coordinates: 20.6020°N 105.2374°W

Café de Olla is a Mexican restaurant in Puerto Vallarta's Zona Romántica, in the Mexican state of Jalisco.

== Description ==
Café de Olla is a Mexican restaurant with an open kitchen in Zona Romántica, Puerto Vallarta. A Fodor's guide published in 2001 said: "This is the place for cheap, down-to-earth, authentic Mexican food... Service is excellent and the atmosphere inviting: trees extend from the dining-room floor through the roof, local artwork adorns the walls, and salsa music often plays in the background." Fodor's has also described the restaurant as "earthy" and said, "Note that as soon as Café de Olla opens for the season, it fills up and seems to stay full: You may need to wait for a table, especially at breakfast and dinner." The menu has included carne asada, chiles rellenos, enchiladas, fajitas, guacamole, quesadillas, and tacos, as well as a seafood platter and margaritas with raicilla.

== History ==
Like many restaurants, Café de Olla closed temporarily upon the arrival of the COVID-19 pandemic. The business reopened on June 10, 2020.

== Reception ==
Frommer's has rated the restaurant two out of three stars. A review for the site wrote, "One of my favorite Vallarta restaurants, the Café de Olla serves up the most consistently delicious Mexican food in town. The atmosphere is simple and festive, and the typically packed dining room is served by a staff that's quick and efficient... Don't come here for romance or refinement, but do come here for great authentic fare, friendly service, and a fun experience." A guide published by Out has acknowledged the restaurant's popularity but recommended the fajitas at Roberto's Puerto Nuevo over those at Café de Olla. Other travel guides have called the business one of the city's "oldest and most cherished" cafes, with "friendly" and "attentive" staff.

== See also ==
- List of Mexican restaurants
- List of restaurants in Mexico
