= Le Kliff =

Restaurant information
- Food type: Mexican
- Location: Jalisco, Mexico
- Website: lekliff.com

Le Kliff is a Mexican restaurant south of Puerto Vallarta, in the Mexican state of Jalisco.

== Description and reception ==
The open-air Mexican restaurant Le Kliff is located south of Puerto Vallarta, near Mismaloya. It is perched on a cliff and overlooks the sea. Fodor's has said Le Kliff has "the best views at a series of open-air patios under a huge palapa roof". The menu has also included Asian and Mediterranean dishes. Seafood options have included lobster tail with avocado emulsion. The restaurant often hosts weddings.

Le Kliff has been called "the classiest restaurant in town" with the "largest palapa roof in the world", as well as "the most beautiful restaurant in Mexico".

== See also ==
- List of Mexican restaurants
- List of restaurants in Mexico
