= Controy =

Mexican liqueur

Controy or Naranja is a Mexican brand of orange liqueur.

Introduced to Mexico in 1933, it sometimes credited as being used in the first Margarita. For nearly a century, Controy was only available in Mexico.

In 2013, Pura Vida Tequila Company of Houston, Texas, acquired the rights to export Controy for sale in the United States. For legal purposes, they changed the product name to Naranja, which means "orange" in Spanish.
