= Café des Artistes (Puerto Vallarta) =

Restaurant in Puerto Vallarta, Jalisco, Mexico

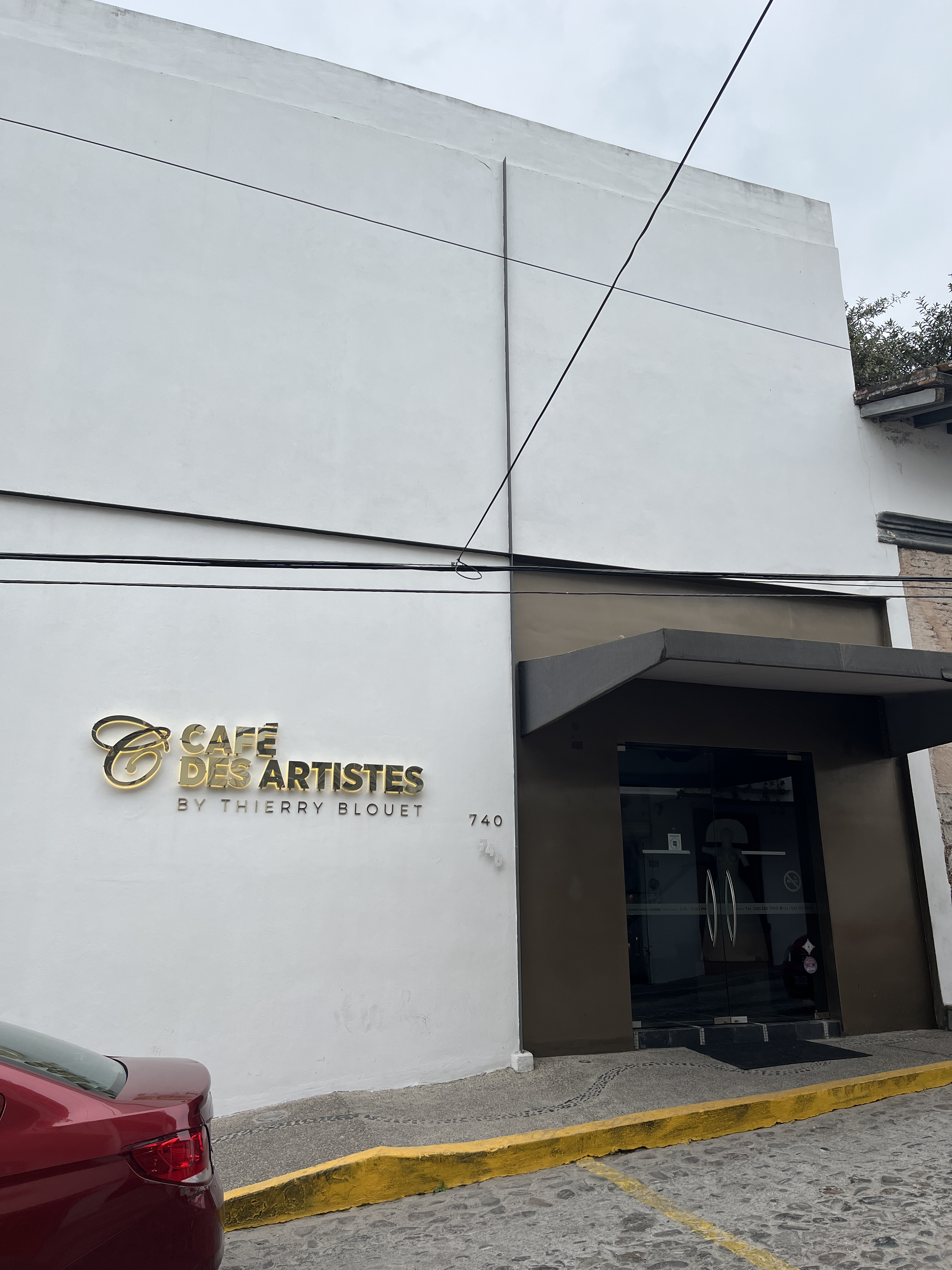
- The restaurant's exterior in 2023
- Interactive map of Café des Artistes

Restaurant information
- Food type: French
- Location: Puerto Vallarta, Jalisco, Mexico
- Coordinates: 20°36′42″N 105°13′56″W
- Website: cafedesartistes.com

Café des Artistes is a restaurant in Puerto Vallarta, in the Mexican state of Jalisco.

== Description ==
The restaurant serves French cuisine, operating only for dinner. Fodor's says, "Several sleek dining spaces make up the original, downtown restaurant Café des Artistes; the most beautiful and romantic is the courtyard garden with modern sculpture."

== Reception ==
In his Moon guide of Puerto Vallarta, Justin Henderson said Café des Artistes is "considered by many to be the best restaurant in town".

== See also ==
- List of French restaurants
- List of restaurants in Mexico
