= Andale's Restaurant & Bar =

Restaurant and bar in Puerto Vallarta, Jalisco, Mexico

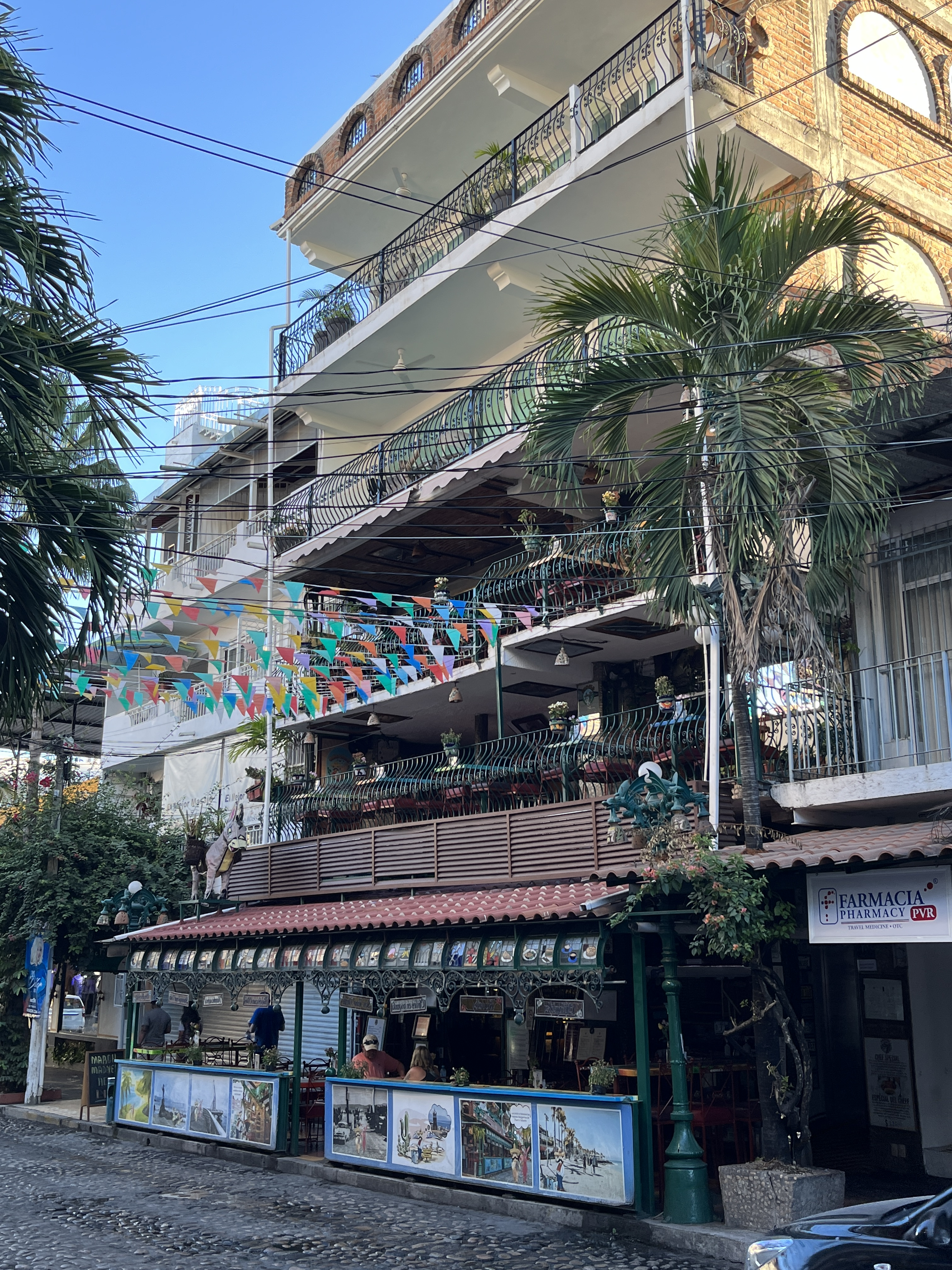
- The restaurant's exterior in 2023
- Interactive map of Andale's Restaurant & Bar

Restaurant information
- Established: 1980
- Owner: Jorge Zambrano Hernandez
- Location: Puerto Vallarta, Jalisco, Mexico
- Coordinates: 20.6011°N 105.2376°W
- Website: andalesrestaurant.com

Andale's Restaurant & Bar, or simply Andale, is a restaurant in Zona Romántica, Puerto Vallarta, in the Mexican state of Jalisco.

== Description ==
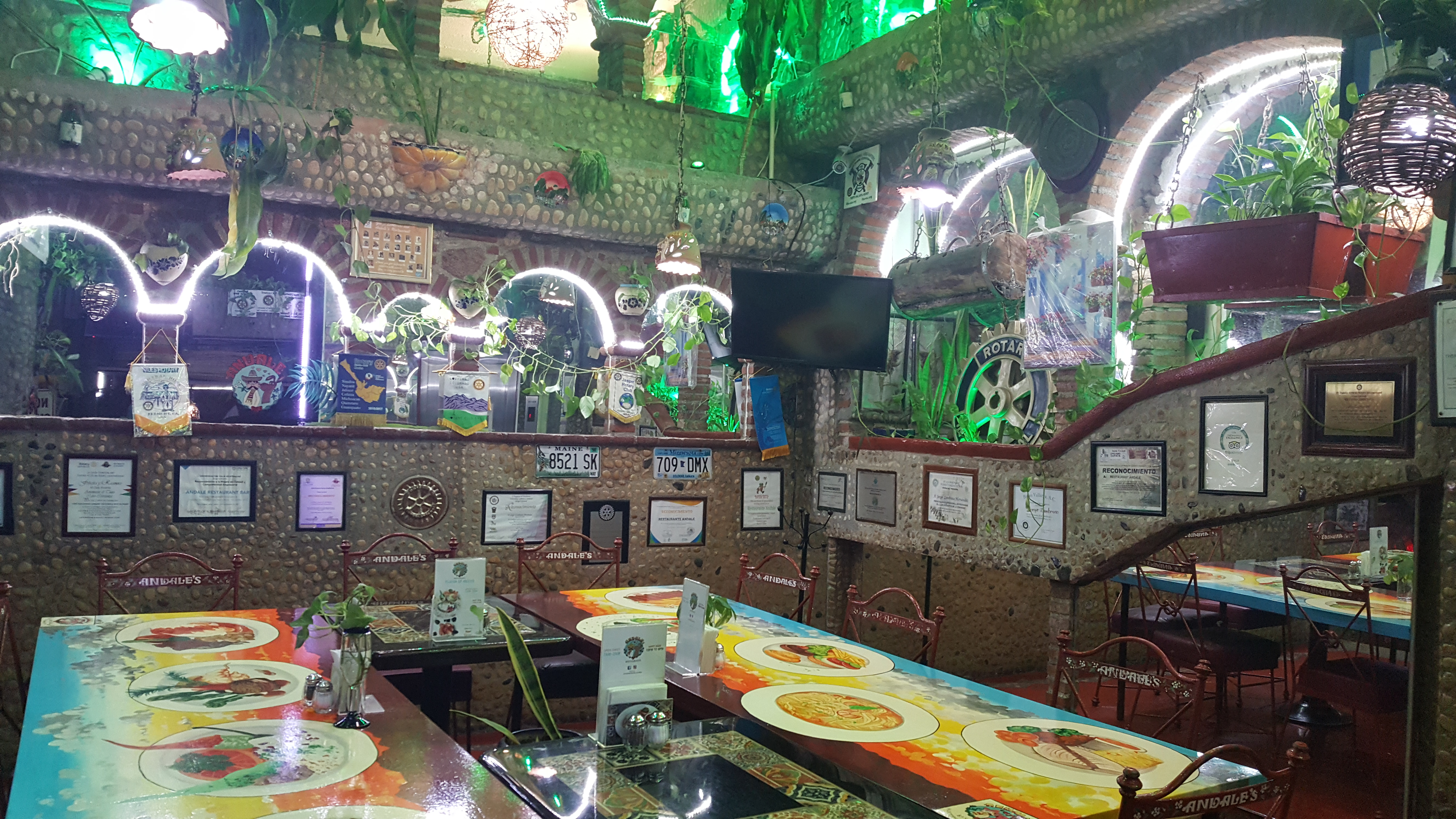
Interior, 2021

Fodor's says, "Although many have been drinking, rather than eating, at this local hangout for years, the restaurant serves fajitas, dependable burgers (of beef, chicken, or fish) with large portions of fries, black-bean soup, jumbo shrimp, and herb-garlic bread along with daily lunch and nightly drink specials at the chummy bar. The interior is cool, dark, and informal; two rows of mini-tables line the sidewalk outside. Service is generally attentive, although that doesn't mean the food will arrive promptly. This spot is party-hearty later in the evening, by 10 pm or so. Plus-size patrons should beware of the munchkin-size toilet stalls."

== History ==
Established in 1980, the business is owned by Jorge Zambrano Hernandez.

A favorite of cast member Vicki Gunvalson, the bar has been featured on The Real Housewives of Orange County.

== See also ==
- List of restaurants in Mexico
