= Coco's Kitchen =

Restaurant in Puerto Vallarta, Jalisco, Mexico

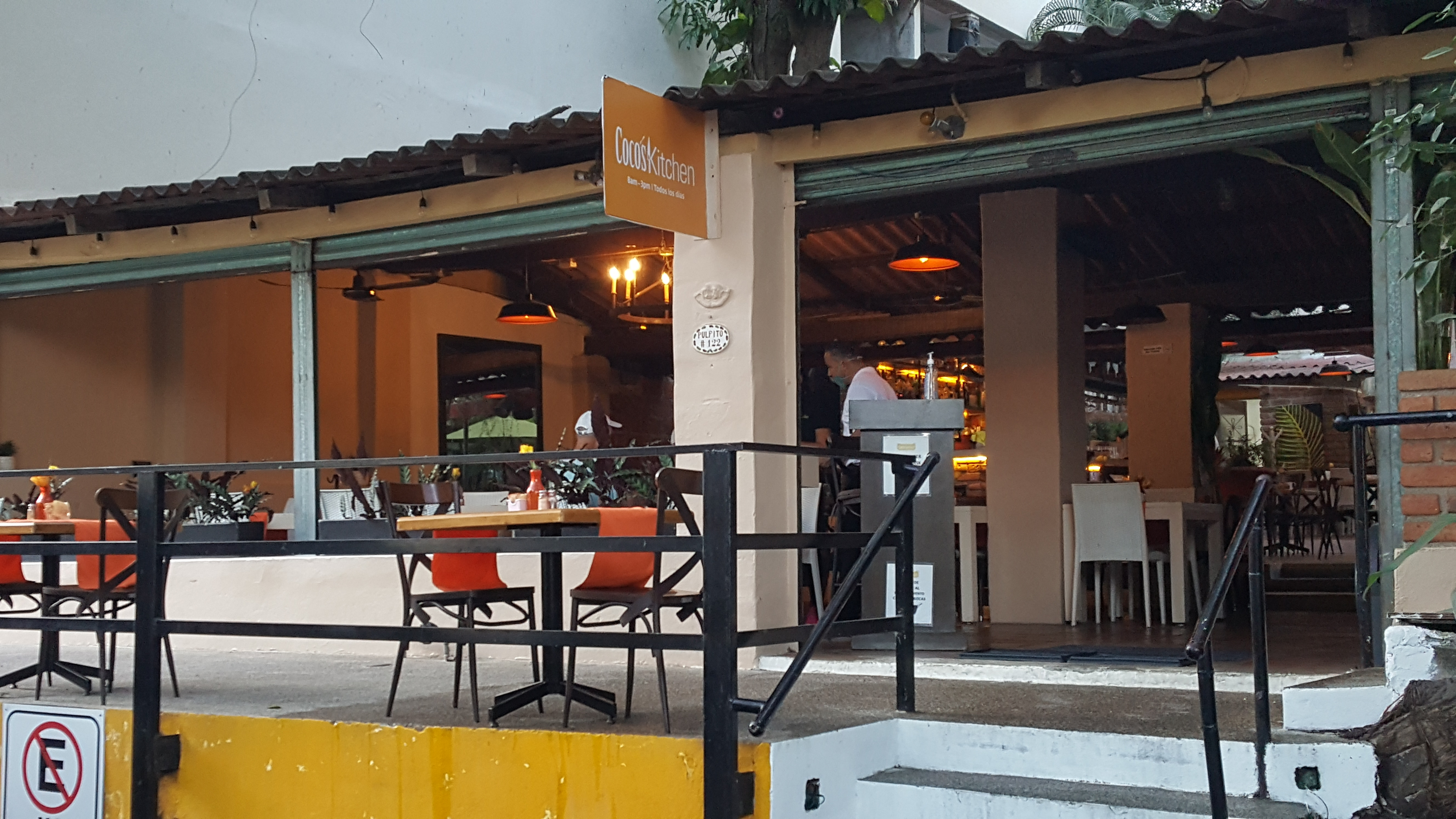
- The restaurant's exterior in 2021
- Interactive map of Coco's Kitchen

Restaurant information
- Location: Puerto Vallarta, Jalisco, Mexico
- Coordinates: 20.5995°N 105.2377°W

Coco's Kitchen' is a restaurant in Zona Romántica, Puerto Vallarta, in the Mexican state of Jalisco.

== Description ==
Lonely Planet says, "At this popular brunch spot south of the river, tables are sprinkled on a ceramic-tiled patio beneath a stilted terracotta roof in a shady bar-side garden. Dishes range from carnitas (braised pulled pork) and green-chili burritos to a range of quesadillas and salads, eggs Benedict, chilaquiles, French toast and pecan waffles, executed with aplomb and served with a smile." In 2016, Ondine Cohane of The New York Times wrote, "Off-duty chefs, artists, local families and Puerto Vallarta insiders head to Coco’s Kitchen for brunch. Join them in the courtyard garden over a plate of huevos rancheros, French toast stuffed with queso and marmalade, and churro hot cakes, with a cup of café con leche."

== History ==
Coco's Kitchen is operated by Coco Iñiguez and her daughter Vanessa Villegas. The restaurant has participated in Restaurant Week and hosted musician Kim Kuzma.

== See also ==
- List of restaurants in Mexico
