= River Cafe (Puerto Vallarta) =

Restaurant in Puerto Vallarta, Jalisco, Mexico

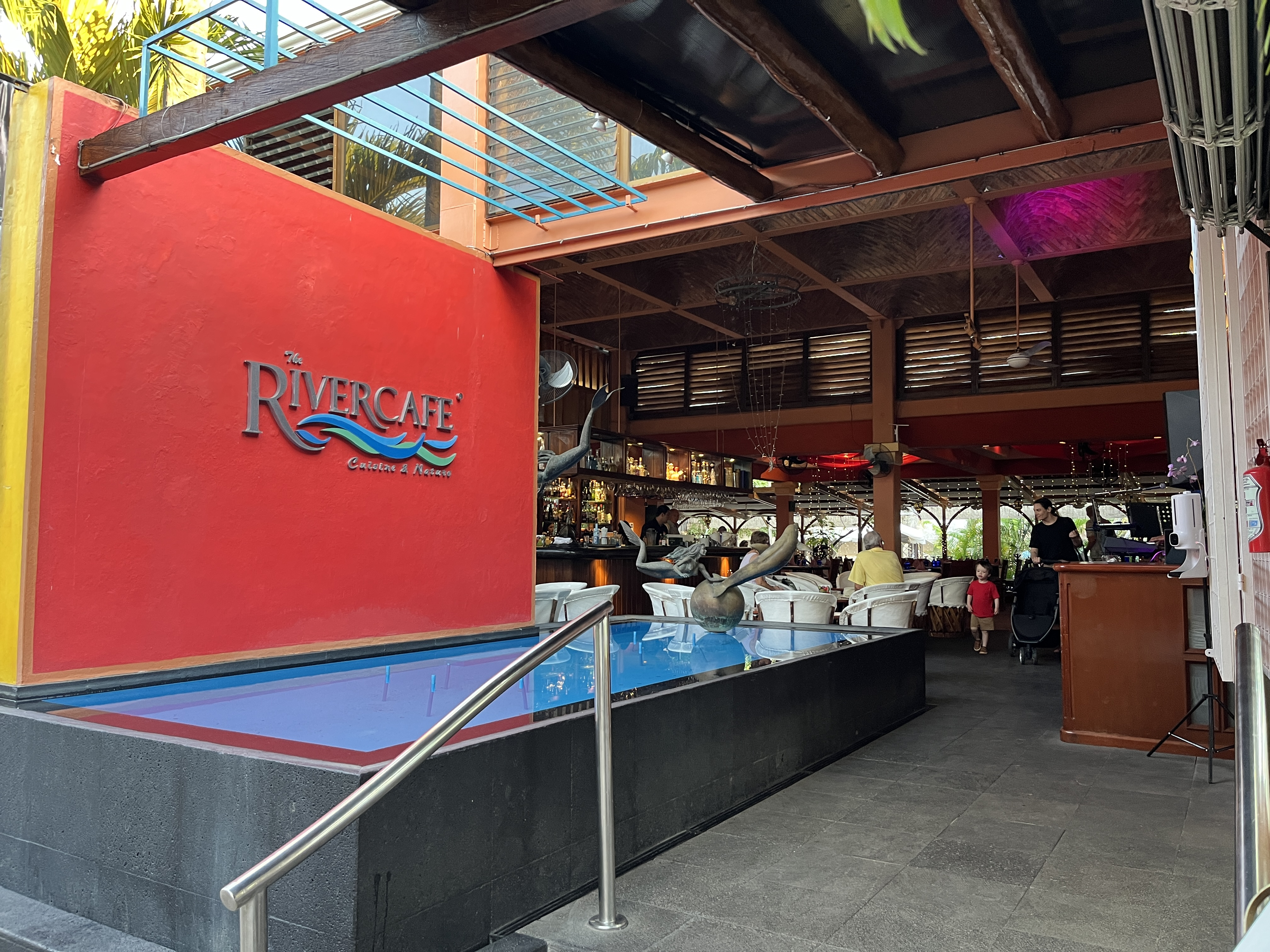
- The restaurant in 2023
- Interactive map of River Cafe

Restaurant information
- Established: 1996
- Owners: Eva Sanchez; Margarito Larios
- Food type: International; Mexican
- Location: Puerto Vallarta, Jalisco, Mexico
- Coordinates: 20.6057°N 105.2363°W
- Website: rivercafe.com.mx

River Cafe is a restaurant on Isla Cuale in Zona Romántica, Puerto Vallarta, in the Mexican state of Jalisco.

== Description ==
The restaurant, described as one of the city's most popular, is located on Isla Cuale and overlooks the Cuale River. The menu includes international and Mexican comfort food; international options include fried calamari, seafood fettuccine, vegetarian crepes, and wild-mushroom soup, and Mexican options include nachos, quesadillas, seared tuna, and guacamole and salsas. According to Fodor's, "At night, candles flicker at white-skirted tables with comfortable cushioned chairs, and tiny white lights sparkle in palm trees surrounding the multilevel terrace." The restaurant hosts live jazz on Friday and Saturday evenings.

== History ==
Owned by Eva Sanchez and Margarito Larios, the restaurant was established in 1996. Willie & Lobo have performed at River Cafe.

== Reception ==
Fodor's recommends the restaurant for breakfast as well as the "evening ambience". Alex Robinson included the River Cafe in The Culture Trip's 2021 list of the city's top restaurants.

== See also ==
- List of Mexican restaurants
- List of restaurants in Mexico
