= Fredy's Tucan =

Restaurant in Puerto Vallarta, Jalisco, Mexico

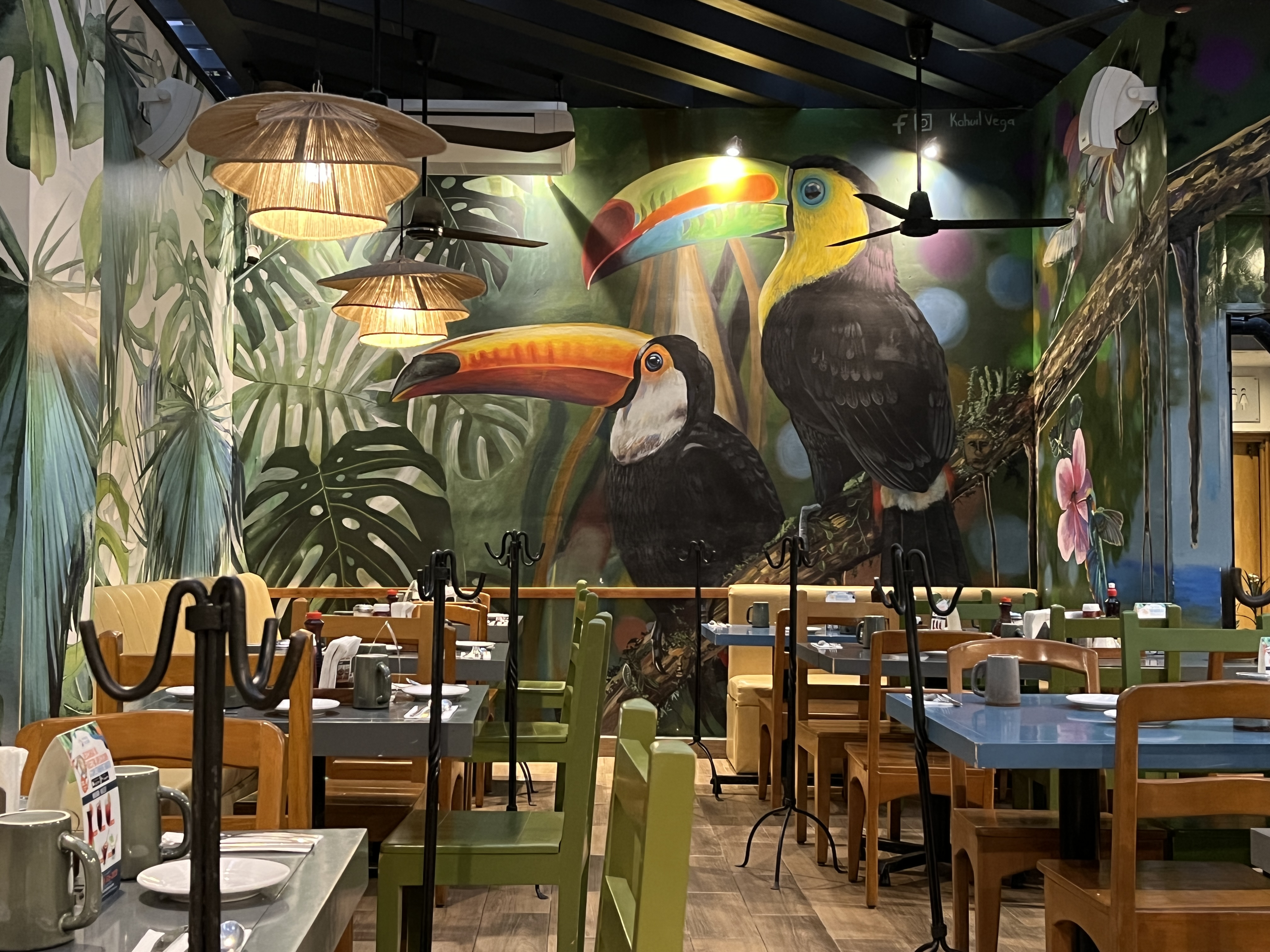
- The restaurant's interior in 2022
- Interactive map of Fredy's Tucan

Restaurant information
- Food type: Mexican; American
- Location: Puerto Vallarta, Jalisco, Mexico
- Coordinates: 20.6024°N 105.2360°W
- Website: fredystucan.com

Fredy's Tucan is a restaurant in Zona Romántica, Puerto Vallarta, in the Mexican state of Jalisco.

== Description ==
The popular restaurant is located at the intersection of Basilio Badillo and Ignacio L. Vallarta. Serving Mexican and American cuisine, the breakfast menu includes Eggs Benedict, omelets, pancakes, waffles and lunch options include burgers, nachos, quesadillas, salads, and soups.

Lonely Planet says, "This gringo breakfast paradise serves waffles, omelets, Mexican dishes and almost anything else you could want. It's in an ample courtyard three blocks from the beach."

== History ==
At times, the restaurant operated via takeout and delivery service during the COVID-19 pandemic.

== Reception ==
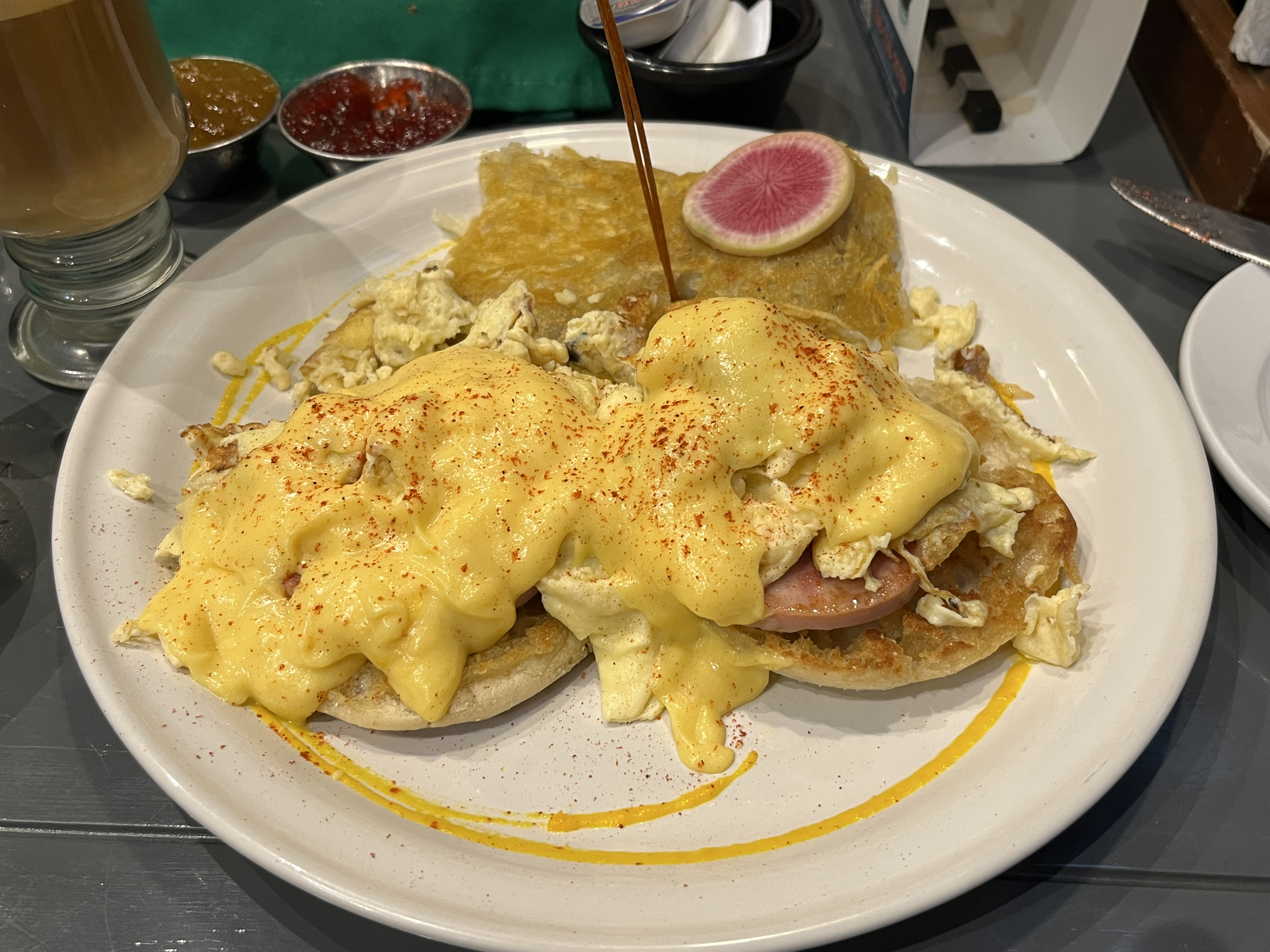
Eggs Benedict, 2022

Natalia Osuna of Vallarta Lifestyle described the restaurant as a "breakfast and brunch favorite for locals and visitors alike" and wrote, "The restaurant’s casual, garden-like atmosphere which surrounds customers makes for a pleasant meal, and is perfect to brighten one’s day".

Fodor's says, "Even in low season, Fredy's, next door to the Hotel de Roger, is packed full of Mexican families, gringo friends, and local business people. Your mug of coffee will be refilled without having to beg; service is brisk, professional, and friendly... Eat on the pretty covered patio or inside, where big plate-glass windows let you keep an eye on busy Calle Basilio Badillo. You can get a fruit smoothie or a stiff drink from the bar."

== See also ==
- List of Mexican restaurants
- List of restaurants in Mexico
