= Tintoque =

Restaurant in Puerto Vallarta, Jalisco, Mexico

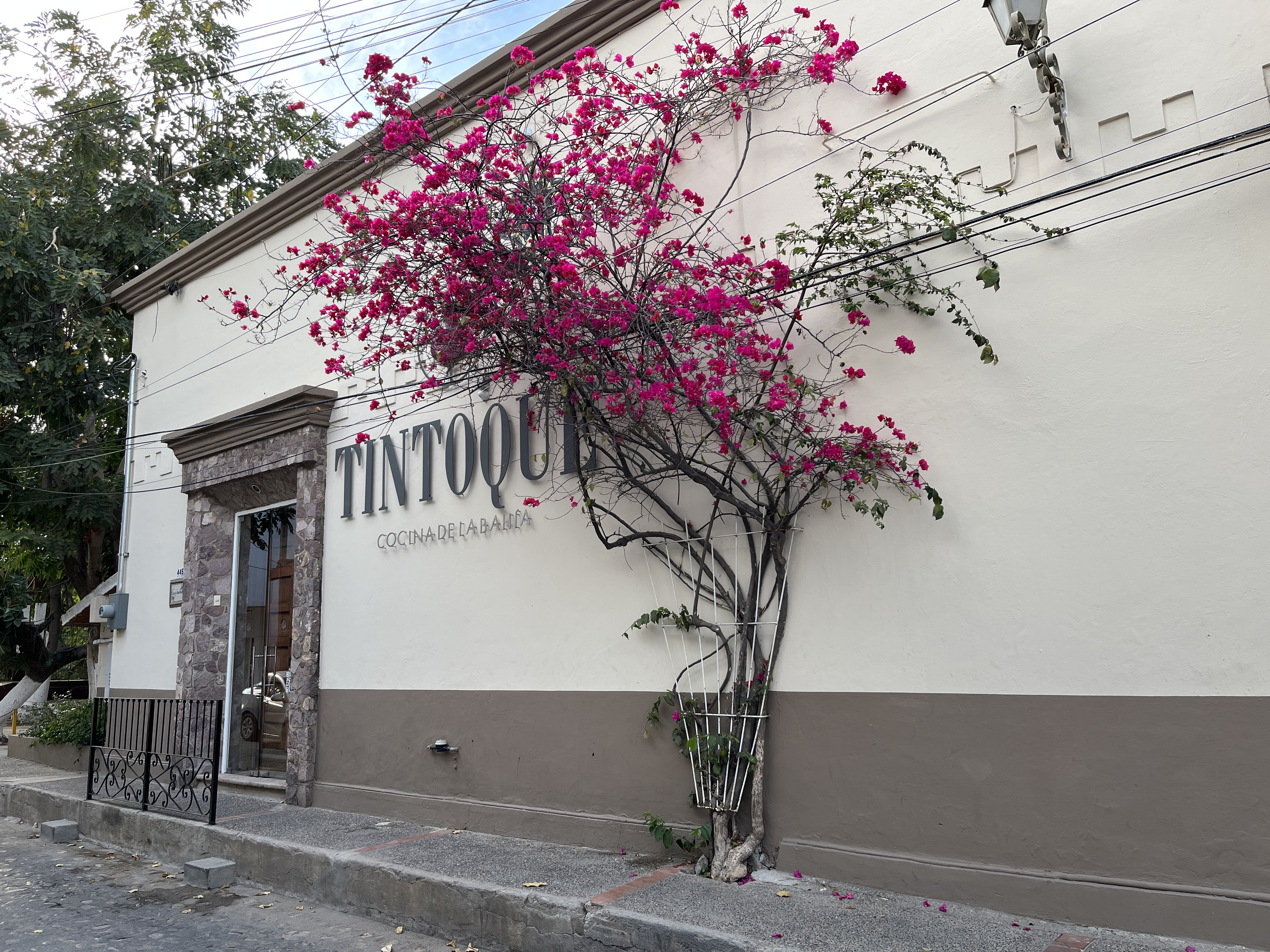
- The restaurant's exterior, 2023
- Interactive map of Tintoque

Restaurant information
- Established: 2016
- Owner: Joel Ornelas
- Chef: Joel Ornelas
- Location: Puerto Vallarta, Jalisco, Mexico
- Coordinates: 20°36′20″N 105°13′56″W
- Website: tintoque.com.mx

Tintoque (also known as La Tintoque Cocina De La Bahia) is a fine dining restaurant in Puerto Vallarta, in the Mexican state of Jalisco. Joel Ornelas is the chef and owner. Paola Briseño-González included the restaurant in Eater's 2022 list of Puerto Vallarta's 25 "essential" restaurants. The business was also included in the Travel Channel's list of the five "top places to eat like a local" in Puerto Vallarta. The restaurant opened in 2016 and was included in Guía México Gastronómico's 2019 list of the 120 best restaurants in Mexico.

== See also ==
- List of restaurants in Mexico
