= Los Muertos Brewing =

Brewery in Puerto Vallarta, Jalisco, Mexico

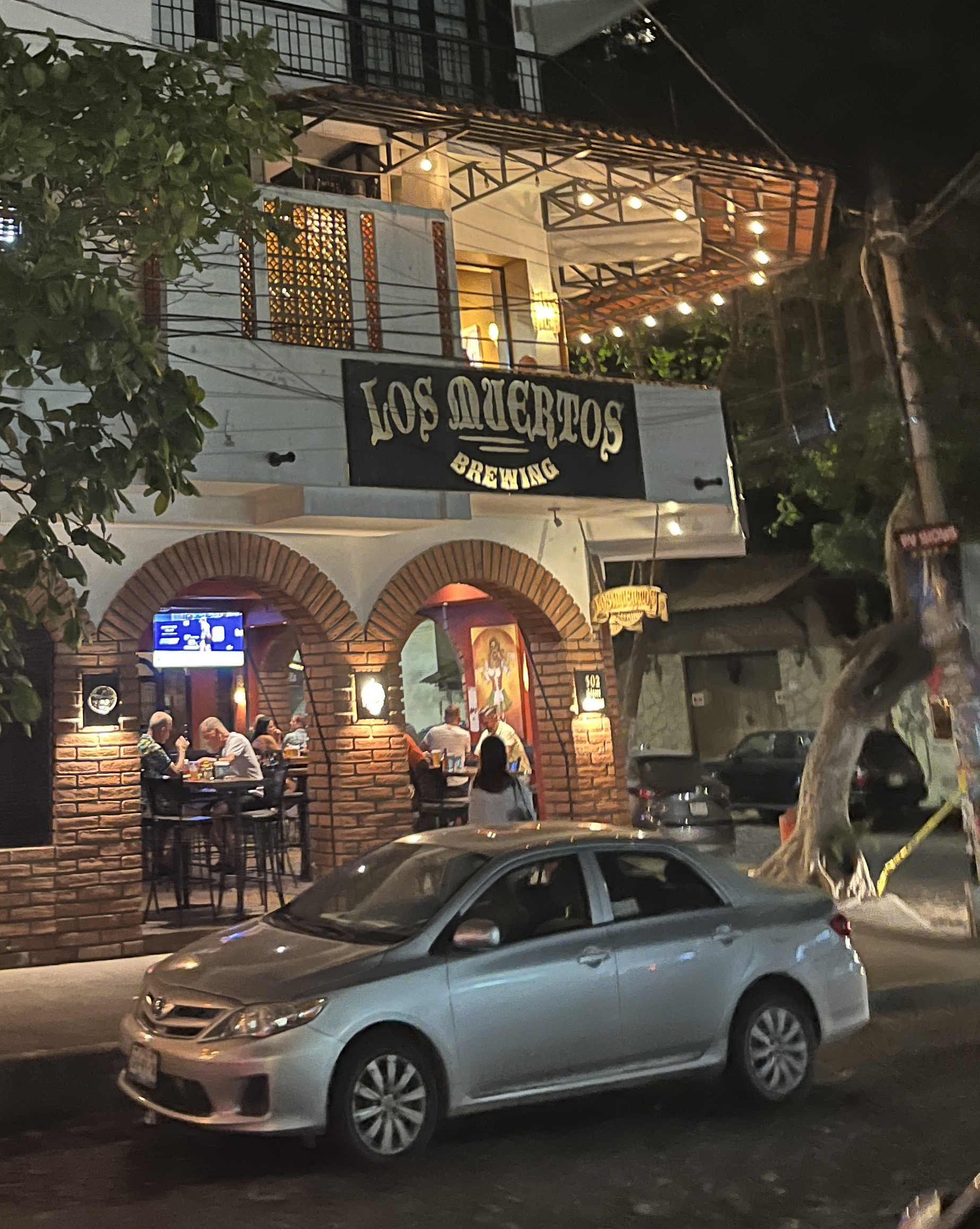
- Exterior of the restaurant in Zona Romántica, 2023
- Interactive map of Los Muertos Brewing

Restaurant information
- Established: 2012
- Owner: Conner Watts
- Location: Puerto Vallarta, Jalisco, Mexico
- Coordinates: 20.6036°N 105.2349°W

Los Muertos Brewing is a brewery and restaurant with two locations in Puerto Vallarta, in the Mexican state of Jalisco. There is one location on Lázaro Cárdenas in Zona Romántica and another on Av. Francisco Villa.

== Description and history ==
Conner Watts founded the business in 2012. The restaurant serves homemade pizza; the drink menu is focused on Los Muertos brews, but other beer options are available as well. In 2019, Jayme Lamm of Houstonia described Los Muertos as a "popular microbrewery offering casual dining with world-class pizza and plenty of craft beer options".

Lonely Planet describes Los Muertos as "an attractive brick-arched, concrete-floored pub and microbrewery that draws a lively mix of old-timers and visitors. The beer comes in seven varieties including a hoppy IPA called 'Revenge', a malty, dark 'Hop On!' that defies easy description, and a fine 'McSanchez' stout." Fodor's says:

If you love a good beer, Los Muertos Brewing Company is for you. The first craft brewery in Puerto Vallarta offers a relaxed atmosphere and the best beer on tap in town. It's a mix between the typical cantina and the traditional sports bar and they have a selection of rock and pop both in English and Spanish. Young gringos love it, and it's also getting attention from locals who come for the pizzas and stay for the beer. It's open every day from noon until midnight.

The business hosts an annual "Fiesta en la Calle" street party.

== See also ==
- List of restaurants in Mexico
