= Isla Cuale =

Island in Puerto Vallarta, Jalisco, Mexico

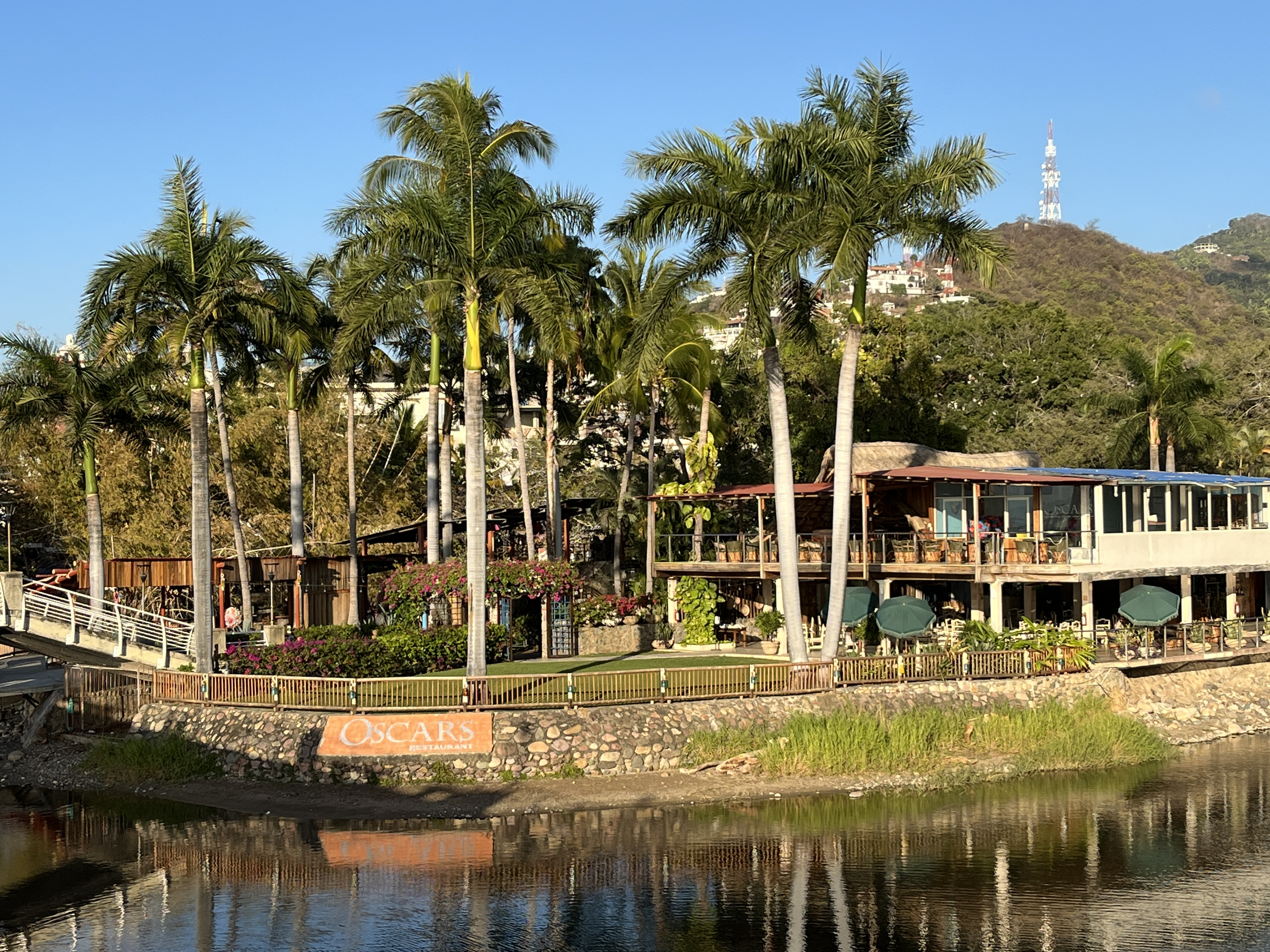
- View of the island from Puente Río Cuale, 2023

- Location within Mexico

Geography
- Coordinates: 20°36′21″N 105°14′05″W

Isla Cuale, or Isla del Río Cuale, is a narrow island with art galleries and restaurants along Puerto Vallarta's Cuale River, in Zona Romántica, in the Mexican state of Jalisco.

La Iguana Bridge connects Centro to Zona Romántica via Isla Cuale. Puente Rio Cuale provides access to the island via the Malecón.

== Features ==
Le Bistro and River Cafe are popular restaurants on Isla Cuale. Identidad (2019) and a statue of John Huston are installed on the island.
