= Archie's Wok =

Asian restaurant in Puerto Vallarta, Jalisco, Mexico

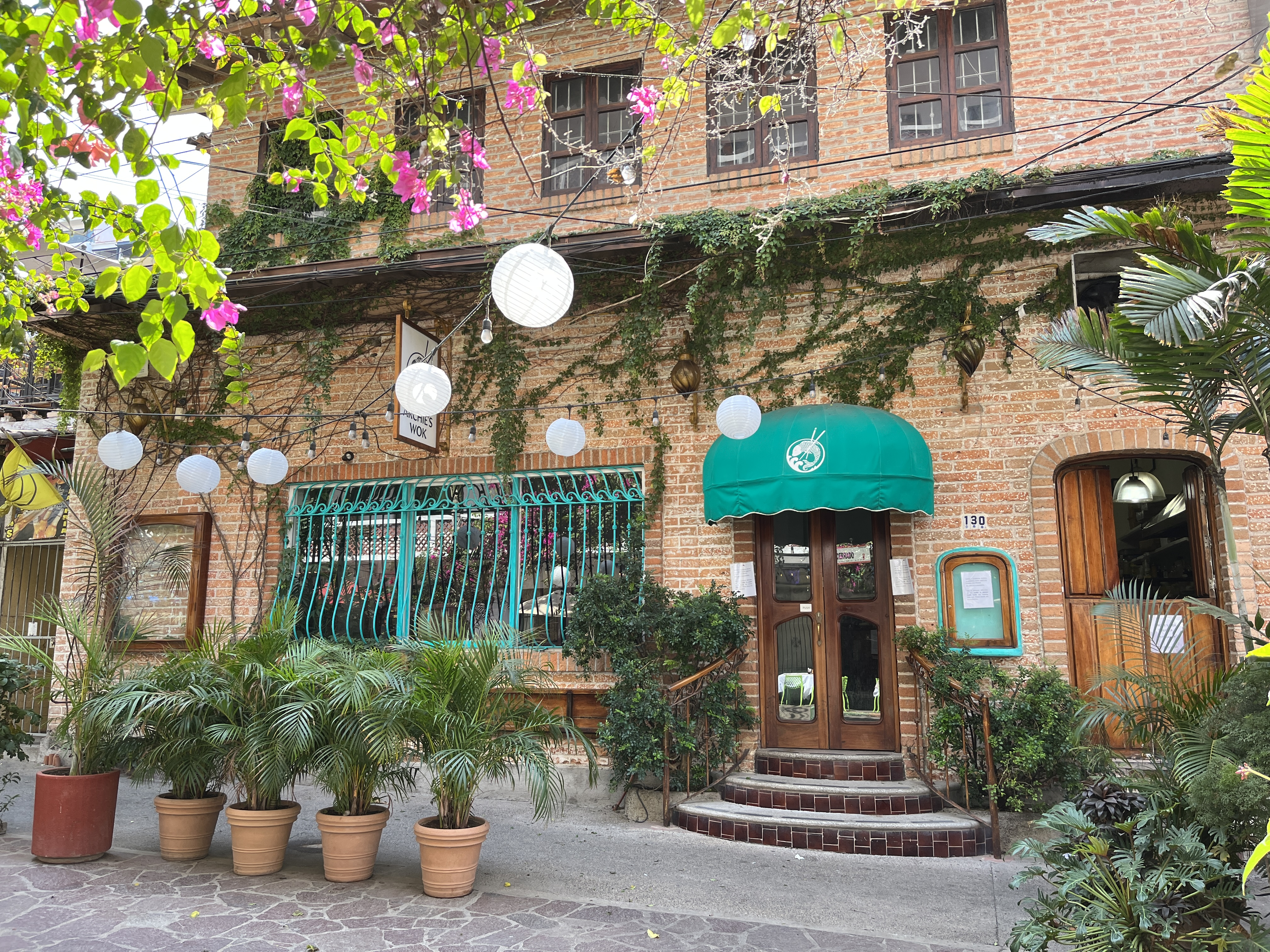
- The restaurant's exterior, 2023
- Interactive map of Archie's Wok

Restaurant information
- Established: 1986
- Food type: Asian
- Location: Puerto Vallarta, Jalisco, Mexico
- Coordinates: 20.6007°N 105.2381°W

Archie's Wok is an Asian restaurant in Puerto Vallarta, in the Mexican state of Jalisco. The restaurant was established in 1986.

== Description ==
Archie's Wok is an Asian restaurant in Puerto Vallarta's Olas Altas district, in Zona Romántica. According to Fodor's, the restaurant has served Chinese, Filipino, and Thai cuisine. The interior has dark wood, high ceilings, Indonesian étagères, and potted palms. The menu has included pancit (Filipino stir-fry and pasta), Singapore-style (lightly battered) fish, Thai garlic shrimp, and a salad with spinach, watercress, feta, pecans, and hibiscus dressing. The restaurant has also served barbecued ribs Hoi Sin, Thai coconut fish, and fried Thai noodles.

== History ==
Archie's Wok was established in 1986. The restaurant was founded by John Huston's friend and personal chef; his widow Cindy Alpenia continues to operate Archie's Wok.

== Reception ==
Frommer's has rated the restaurant three out of three stars.

== See also ==
- List of restaurants in Mexico
