= Statue of John Huston =

Statue in Puerto Vallarta, Jalisco, Mexico

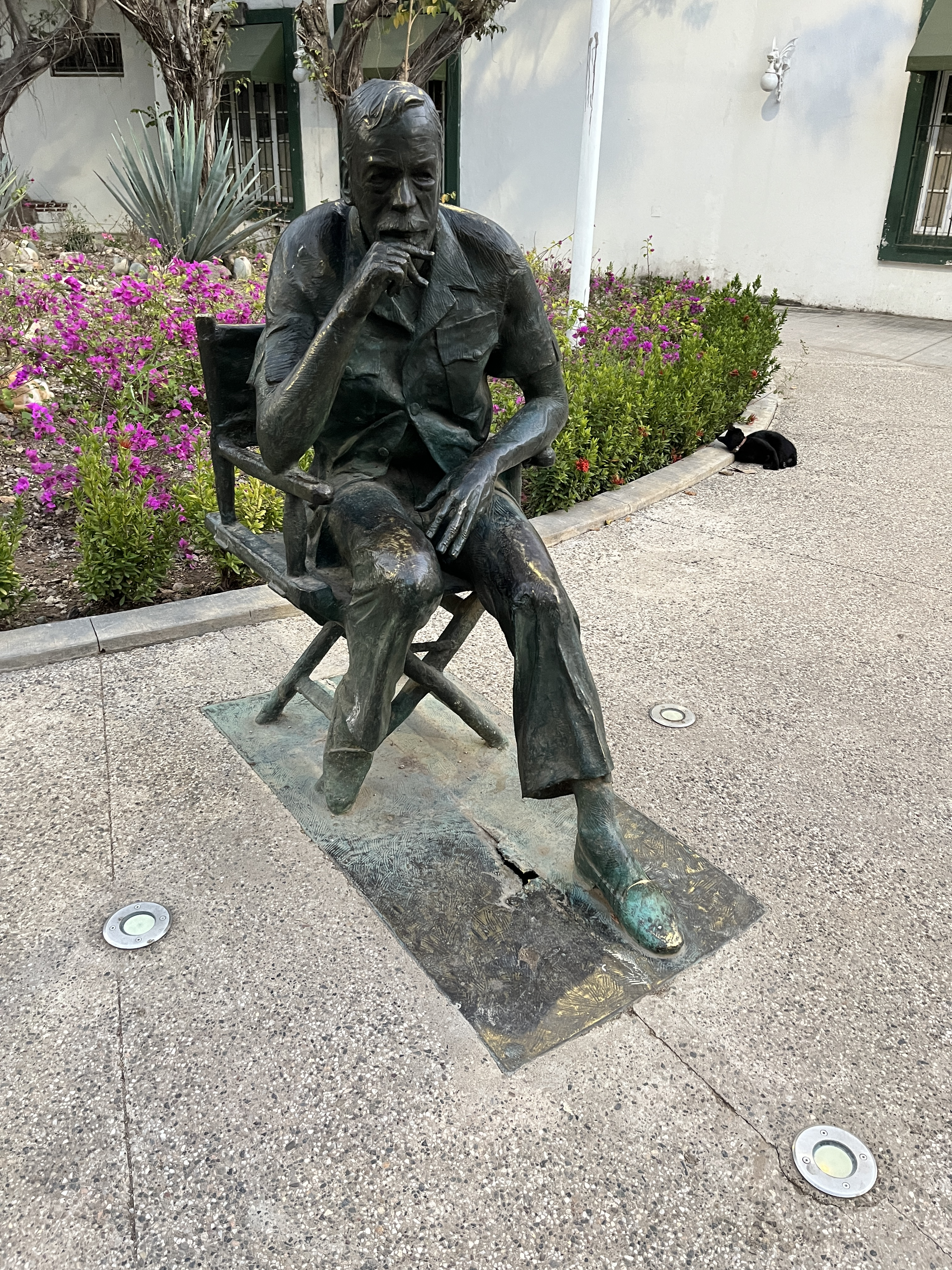
- The statue in 2023
- Subject: John Huston
- Location: Puerto Vallarta, Jalisco, Mexico; 20°36′21.3″N 105°14′1.9″W

A statue of John Huston stands on Isla Cuale, an island in Zona Romántica, Puerto Vallarta, in the state of Jalisco, Mexico. It was installed in 1988. The sculpture commemorated Huston's film Night of the Iguana (1964) and "its part in local history".

== See also ==
- 1988 in art
