= Hussong's =

Oldest cantina in Baja California

Hussong's Cantina
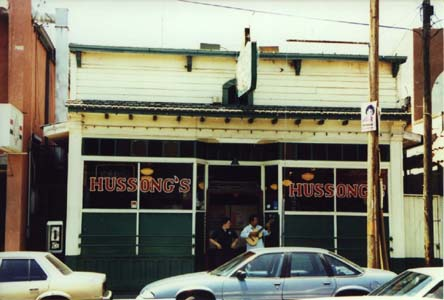
- Hussong's Cantina
- Interactive map of Hussong's Cantina

Restaurant information
- Established: 1892
- Location: Avenida Ruiz 113, Ensenada, Baja California, 22800, Mexico
- Coordinates: 31°51′55″N 116°37′42″W
- Other locations: Las Vegas, Nevada, US

Hussong's Cantina is the oldest and best known cantina in Baja California, Mexico.

The original Hussong's is located in Ensenada, Baja California, Mexico, and was established in 1892. The second Hussong's Cantina opened in Las Vegas, Nevada, in January 2010.

Hussong's is reputedly the place where the Margarita was created in October 1941 by bartender Don Carlos Orozco. He concocted a mixture of equal parts tequila, damiana (Cointreau is used now) and lime, served over ice in a salt-rimmed glass for Margarita Henkel, daughter of the German Ambassador to Mexico.

== History ==
Hussong's founder, John Hussong, was born as "Johann" in Landau, Germany in 1863. Johann emigrated to the United States from Germany in 1888, and changed his name to John. In 1889, the discovery of gold south of the border lured John to Ensenada. John made a living hunting and trading supplies up and down the Baja coast. In June 1891, while on a trading expedition to El Arco, John's carriage flipped over, and his companion, Newt House, fractured his leg. John brought Newt to recuperate at Meiggs' Bar, which back then, was Ensenada's only watering hole. Two days after John and Newt arrived at the bar, Meiggs attacked his wife with an axe. When Meiggs was sent to jail, his wife fled to California. When he got out of jail, Meiggs went in search of his wife, and asked John to mind the bar until he returned. Neither Meiggs nor his wife ever returned.

Inside the cantina (1999)

After operating the bar for nearly a year, John purchased and remodeled the building across the street, which was a Southern Lane stage coach stop that bookended the route between Los Angeles and Ensenada. In 1892 he obtained an alcohol license and started operating the John Hussong Bar. His license is still #002 and the building is still located on Ruiz Avenue. Today, Hussong's Cantina is in the same building in which it was founded and little has changed since it opened.

Hussong's Cantina opened its second location in January 2010, on the Las Vegas strip, at the Mandalay Bay Hotel.
