= San Ángel Inn =

San Angel Inn is an old Carmelite monastery which was turned into a well-known restaurant in the southwest of Mexico City in the historic neighborhood of San Ángel. It is famous for its international cuisine, variety of dishes, Mexican-colonial architecture and interior decorations, and spacious gardens and fountains. In the old Hacienda Goicoechea, viceroys, their consorts, and the aristocracy would relax and take a break in New Spain's capital.

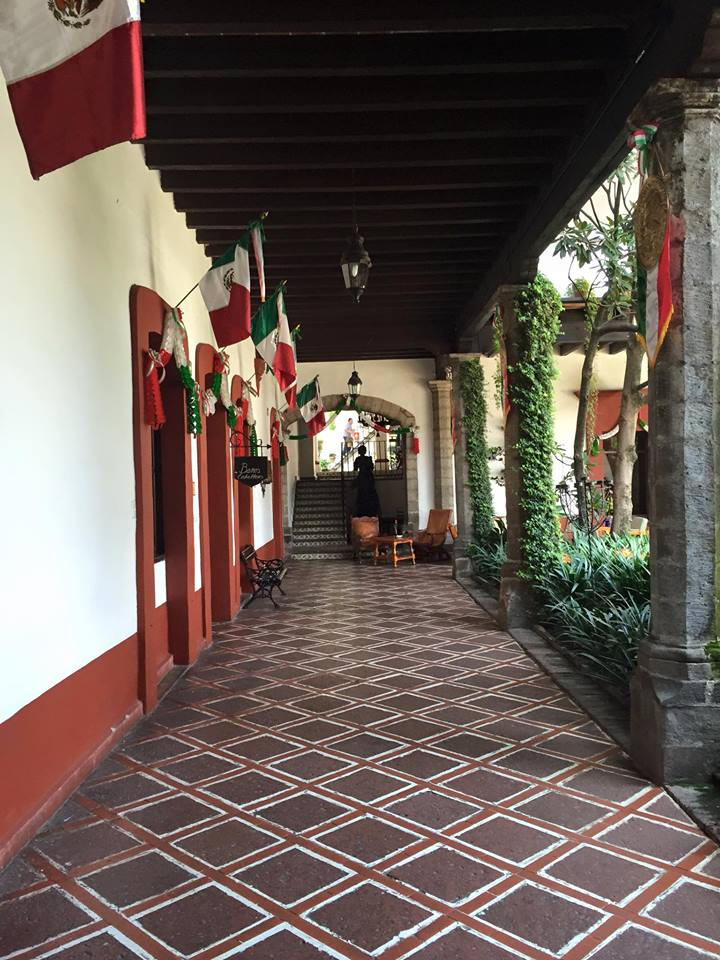
Entrance to San Ángel Inn

== History ==
The construction of the Hacienda Goicochea (currently San Ángel Inn) dates back to the 17th century (1692). It was initially built by the Carmelites, for the purpose of becoming a monastery, but official records show that the concession was granted by Carlos III to the Counts of Pinillas and the Marquis of Sierra Nevada.

The hacienda was acquired by Ramón Goicoechea in 1776, who integrated the property to his own hacienda. This is the origin of the Hacienda's name.

One of its other proprietors was don Francisco Manuel Sánchez de Tagle (1782-1847) a poet and a politician, descendant of the Marquis of Altamira. At the end of the Viceroyal reign, he sympathized with the independence movement, and when Mexico became a Republic, he became a Senator. He was an excellent diplomat and kept good relations with the first Spanish ambassador in Mexico, Ángel Calderón de la Barca y Belgrano and his wife Fanny Cálderon de la Barca, who wrote "Life in Mexico, During a Residence Of Two Years In That Country" (La Vida en México, Durante Una Residencia de Dos Años en este País) during her stay there.

Another novelist that wrote about the Hacienda Goicoechea was the celebrated poet José Zorrilla y Moral (Don Juan Tenorio's author), who during his stay in Mexico City (1859) wrote in his book Recuerdos de mi Vida about the hacienda's beautiful patios and its "dozen orange trees that refreshed the atmosphere in a florentine marble fountain."

The same fountain described by José Zorrilla y Moral served as a place where Pancho Villa and Emiliano Zapata's horses drank water, while waiting for their masters to finish dividing the country's territory into North (Villa) and South (Zapata), during their triumphant arrival to the nation's capital with the Conventionalist Army in 1914.

Later on, the old Hacienda Goicoechea became a pulque factory of approximately 400 hectares, and around 1906, it was acquired by the San Angel Land Co. that created a housing development called Altavista. The main building or house became a famous hotel and restaurant named San Angel Inn, operated by a French woman called Madame Roux. Many famous characters from that time visited the restaurant, its gardens, and its ballroom.

In 1937, the National Institute for History and Arts (INHA) declared the property a Colonial monument. Between 1955 and 1966, the Universidad Iberoamericana gave art and architectural courses in the facility.
