= Hotel Regis =

Historic hotel in California, United States

- U.S. National Register of Historic Places
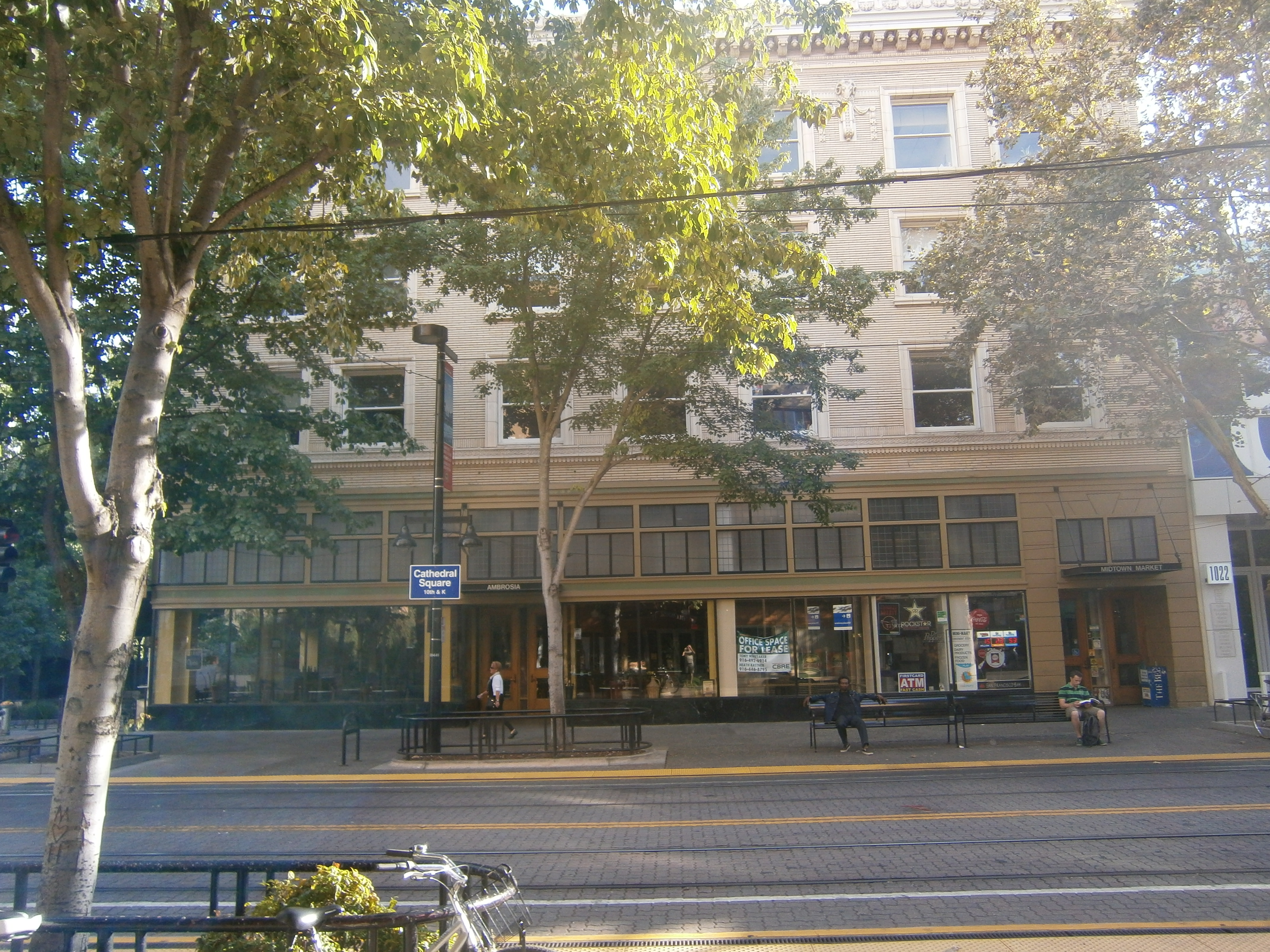

- Location within Sacramento, California Location within California Location within the United States
- Location: 1024-1030 K St, Sacramento, California
- Coordinates: 38°34′43.3″N 121°29′34.5″W
- Area: 0.07 acres (0.028 ha)
- Built: 1912
- Architectural style: Renaissance Revival and Chicago School
- NRHP reference No.: 82000979
- Added to NRHP: October 29, 1982

The Hotel Regis located in Sacramento, California is a historic hotel with a design drawing upon Renaissance Revival and Chicago School architecture styles.
