= Margarita =

Mexican cocktail of tequila, triple sec, and lime juice

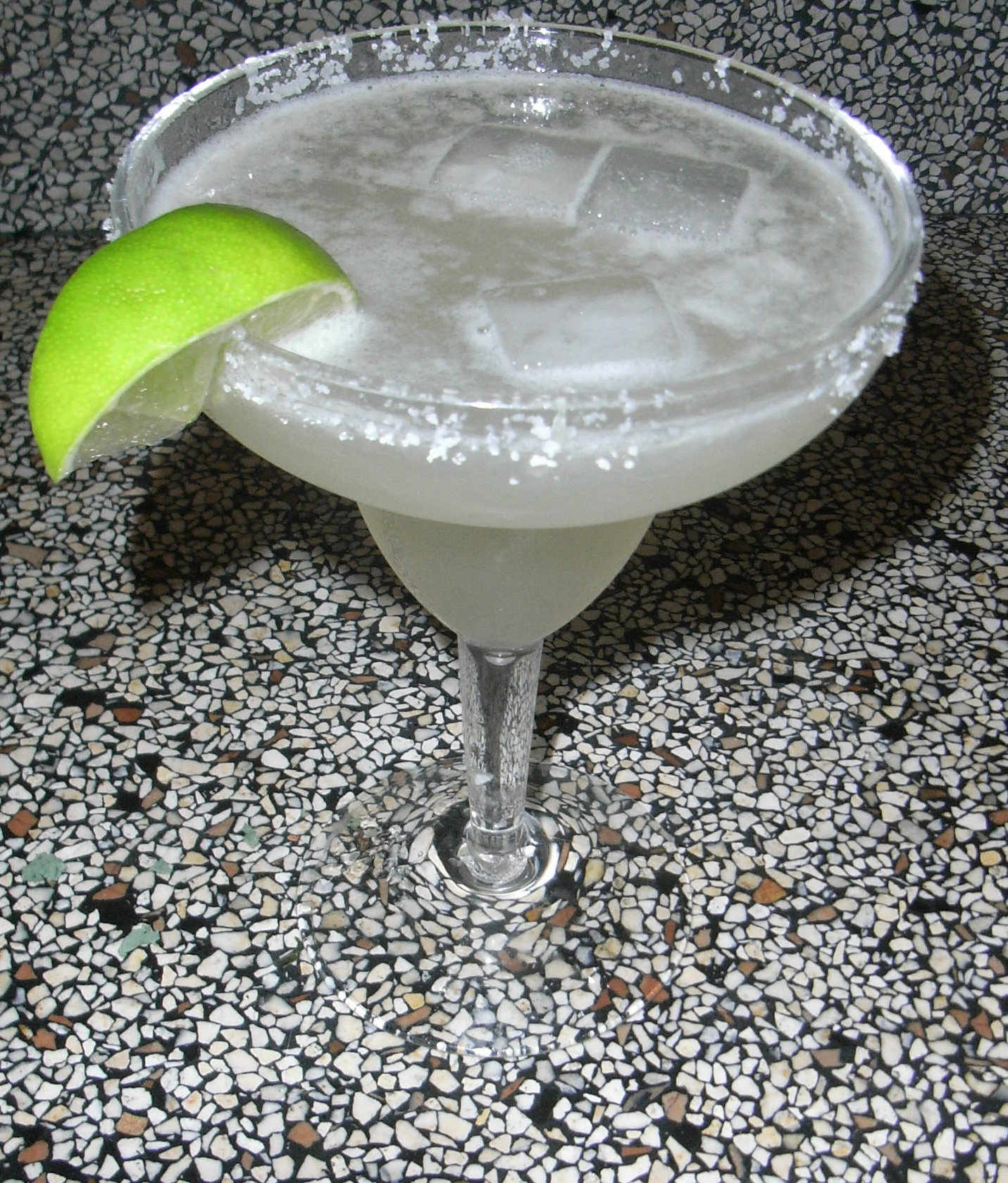
- Type: Cocktail
- Origin: Mexico
- Ingredients: 50 ml tequila 100% agave; 20 ml triple sec; 15 ml freshly squeezed lime juice
- Base spirit: Tequila
- Website: iba-world.com/iba-cocktail/margarita/
- Standard drinkware: Margarita glass
- Standard garnish: Salt or Tajín rim (optional)
- Served: Rocks, straight up, frozen
- Preparation: Add all ingredients into a shaker with ice. Shake and strain into a chilled cocktail glass.

A margarita is a cocktail made of tequila, triple sec, lime juice, and sometimes simple syrup. It is served shaken with ice (on the rocks), without ice (straight up), or blended with ice (frozen). Most bars serve margaritas in a stepped-diameter variant of a cocktail glass or champagne coupe called a margarita glass, often with salt or Tajín on the rim of the glass. The margarita is one of the US most popular cocktails and the most popular tequila-based cocktail.

== Origin ==
The history of the margarita is uncertain. According to cocktail historian David Wondrich, the margarita is related to the brandy daisy (margarita is Spanish for "daisy"), remade with tequila instead of brandy. (Daisies are a family of cocktails that include a base spirit, liqueur, and citrus. A sidecar and gin daisy are other related drinks.) There is an account from 1936 of Iowa newspaper editor James Graham finding such a cocktail in Tijuana, years before any of the other margarita "creation myths".

The Cafe Royal Cocktail Book, published in the UK in 1937, contains a recipe for a Picador using the same concentrations of tequila, triple sec, and lime juice as a margarita. One of the earliest stories is of the margarita being invented in 1938 by Carlos "Danny" Herrera at his restaurant Rancho La Gloria, halfway between Tijuana and Rosarito, Baja California, created for customer and former Ziegfeld dancer Marjorie King, who was allergic to many spirits, but not to tequila. This story was related by Herrera and also by bartender Albert Hernandez, acknowledged for popularizing a margarita in San Diego after 1947, at the La Plaza restaurant in La Jolla. The story was debunked in 1992 by the San Diego Reader.

According to Jose Cuervo, the cocktail was invented in 1938 by a bartender in honor of Mexican showgirl Rita de la Rosa.

Hussong's Cantina also claims to have been the site of the margarita's creation in Ensenada, Baja California, in 1941. Bartender Don Carlos Orozco reputedly named a new drink after Mexican-German patron Margarita Henkel Cesena, a frequent customer to the cantina. Cesena was a ranch operator by trade, and it is disputed whether she was the daughter of a German ambassador as the story claims. Hussong's, however, has enjoyed widespread popularity as the home of the original margarita.

There are also claims that the margarita was first mixed in Juárez, Chihuahua at Tommy's Place Bar on July 4, 1942, by Francisco "Pancho" Morales. Morales later left bartending in Mexico and moved to the US, where he worked as a milkman for 25 years. Mexico's official news agency Notimex and many experts have said Morales has the strongest claim to having invented the margarita.

Others say the inventor was Dallas socialite Margarita Sames when she concocted the drink for her guests at her Acapulco, Guerrero vacation home in 1948. Tommy Hilton reportedly attended, bringing the drink back to the Hilton chain of hotels. However, Jose Cuervo was already running ad campaigns for the margarita three years earlier, in 1945, with the slogan, "Margarita: It's more than a girl's name."

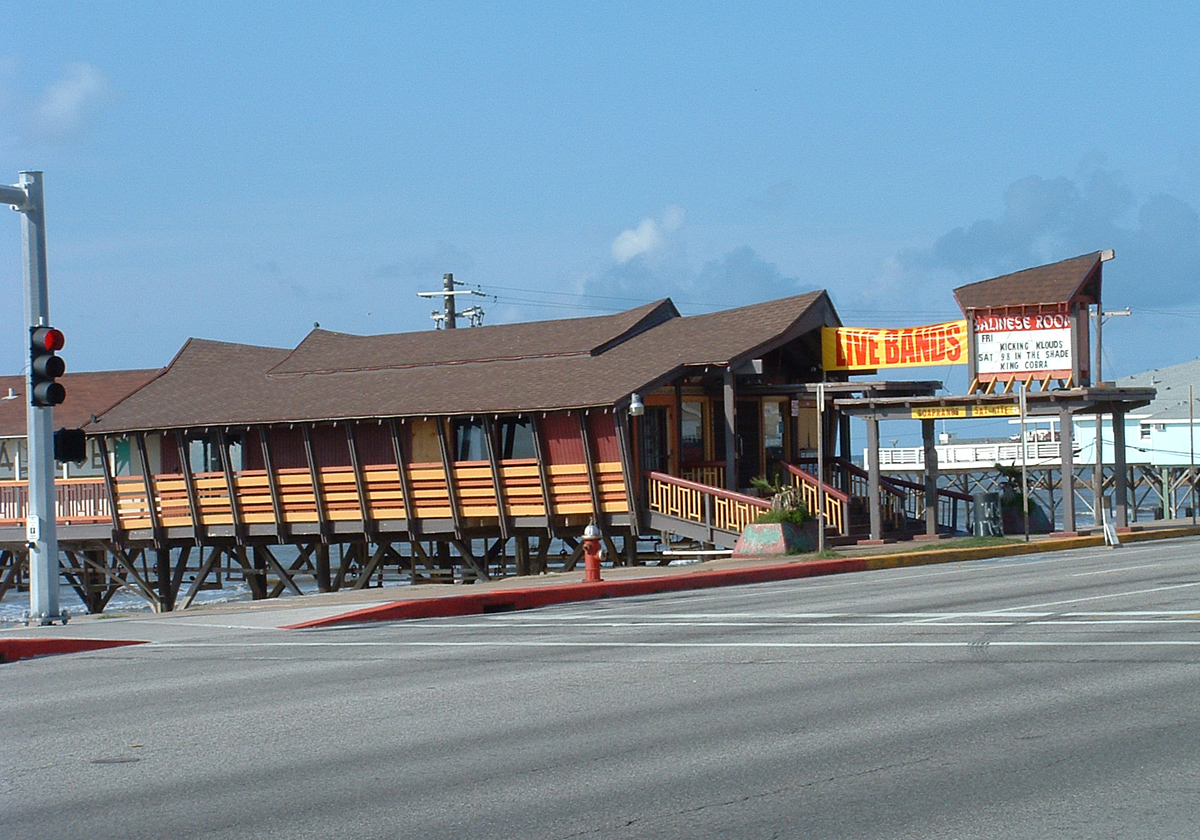
The Balinese Room in Galveston, Texas

Another common origin tale begins the cocktail's history at the legendary Balinese Room in Galveston, Texas, where, in 1948, head bartender Santos Cruz created the margarita for singer Peggy Lee. He supposedly named it after the Spanish version of her name, Margarita.

The first known publication of a margarita recipe was in the December 1953 issue of Esquire, with a recipe calling for an ounce of Sierra tequila, a dash of triple sec, and the juice of half a lime or lemon. A recipe for a tequila-based cocktail first appeared in the 1930 book My New Cocktail Book by G. F. Steele. Without noting a specific recipe or inventor, a drink called the Tequila Daisy was mentioned in the Syracuse Herald-Journal as early as 1936. Margarita is Spanish for Daisy, which is a nickname for Margaret.

A later, certainly false, story is that the margarita was invented in October 1961, at a party in Houston, Texas, by partygoers Robert James "Rusty" Thomson, Miguel "Gonzo" Gonzalez and Oliver "rocket silver" Gonzalez while acting as bartenders. They concocted a mixture of equal parts tequila, Controy orange liqueur, lime, and crushed ice in a salt-rimmed glass.

== Variations ==
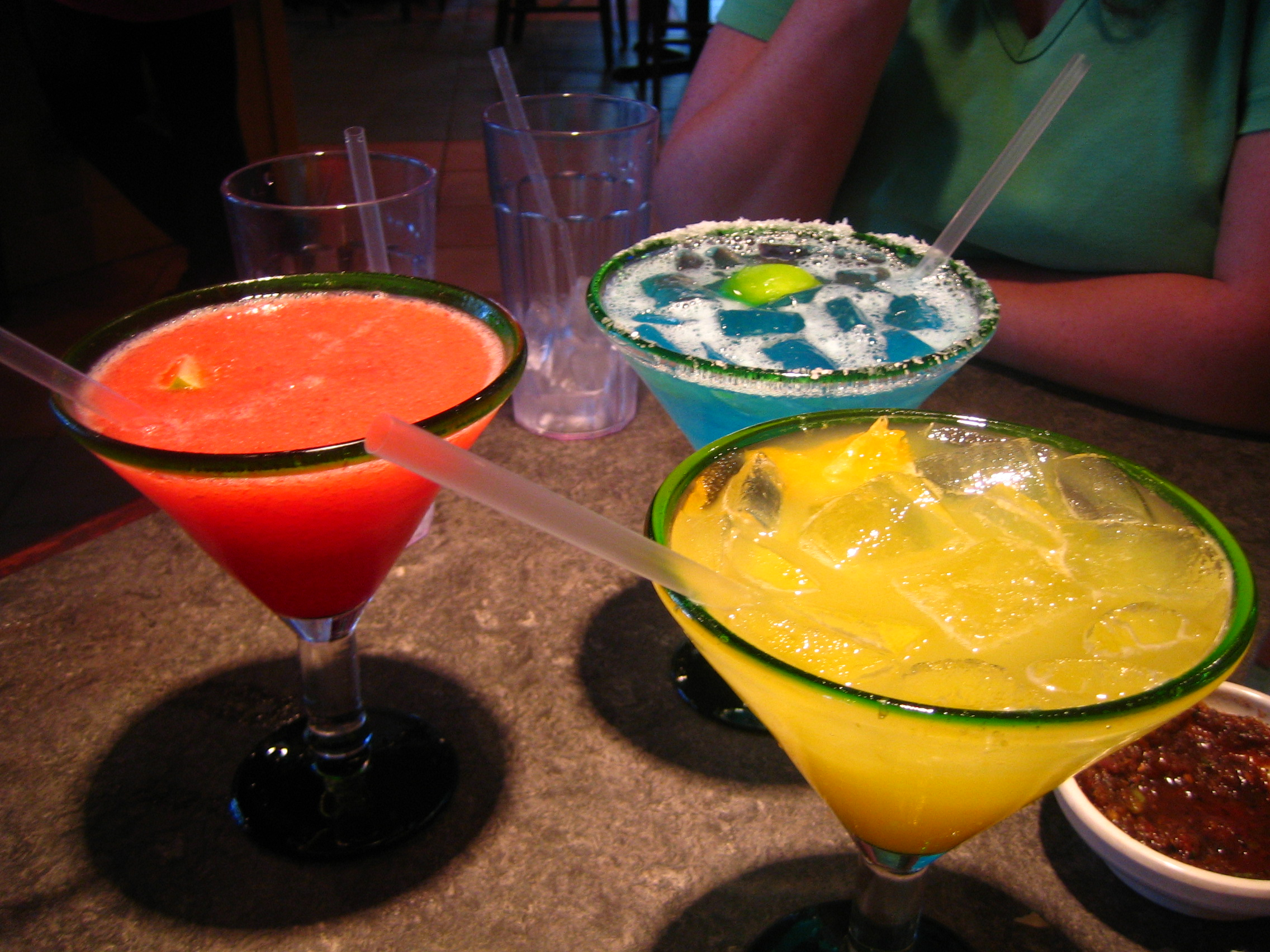
Margaritas come in a variety of flavors and colors.

The IBA (IBA Official list of Cocktails) standard is 10:4:3, that is, tequila:triple sec:fresh lime juice.

The "Original Margarita" recipe, as given by Cointreau on their website, has slightly more of their own sweet liqueur: 1 part white tequila, 1/2 part Cointreau, and 1/2 part fresh squeezed lime juice.

=== Flavored tequila ===
Apple-cinnamon tequila, triple sec, cranberry juice, fresh lime juice, and an apple wedge or lemon twist for garnish combine to form the Cranberry Margarita With Apple-Cinnamon Tequila, a fall seasonal drink.

=== Flavored liqueurs ===
Besides Cointreau, other orange-flavored liqueurs that might be used include Flor de Azar (yielding an all-Mexican margarita), Grand Marnier (yielding the "Cadillac Margarita"), Gran Gala, other brands of triple sec, or blue curaçao (yielding the blue margarita). When sweeter fruit juices or freshly puréed fruits are added to the margarita, the orange-flavored liqueur is often reduced or omitted. In addition to orange-flavored liqueurs, secondary liqueurs may occasionally be added to a cocktail, including melon-flavored or black raspberry-flavored. Other flavors include pineapple and watermelon.

=== Fresh lime juice ===
Freshly squeezed lime juice is the key ingredient. The most common lime in the United States is the thick-skinned Persian lime. However, margaritas in Mexico are generally made with Mexican limes (Key limes). These are small, thin-skinned limes with a more tart and often bitter flavor than Persian limes.

=== Frozen margarita ===
The frozen margarita is a margarita served as an ice slush, similar to other tropical-inspired frozen mixed drinks like the hurricane or piña colada. The ingredients can be processed with ice in a kitchen blender, or for larger output, a slush or soft-serve ice cream machine is used: a cooled, horizontal cylinder has a rotating impeller that churns the mix so it will not freeze solid, and the thick half-frozen slush is dispensed from a spout. Frozen margaritas were first served in La Jolla, when Albert Hernandez Sr. stopped using crushed ice and instead combined the ingredients in a blender in 1947. The dedicated frozen margarita machine was introduced by Mariano Martinez in Dallas in 1971.

A lemonade or limeade margarita can be quickly whipped up by using frozen lemonade or limeade concentrate in place of lime juice.

=== Fruit sodas and sports drinks ===
Fruity sodas such as fruit punch, lime, pineapple, or mandarin orange Jarritos, or sports drinks such as blue or orange Gatorade, can substitute for triple sec. A margarita made with orange soda and beer is a sunrise beer margarita; if it is made with carbonated fruit punch soda, it is a sunset margarita. The variant that uses grapefruit soda is called a Paloma.

=== Other fruits and vegetables ===
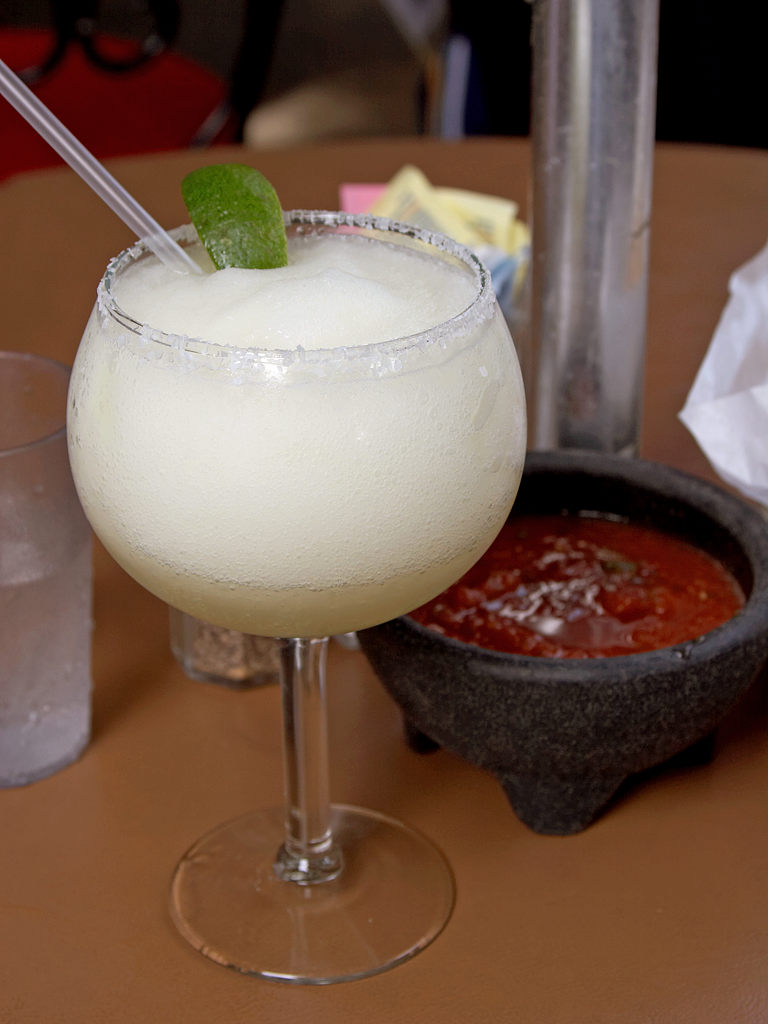
A blended margarita

Alternate fruits and juice mixtures can also be used in a margarita. Fruits like mango, peach, strawberry, banana, cranberry, melon, raspberry, blueberry, or avocado are suitable for creating this drink. Orange juice and pomegranate juice (poured down the inner side of the glass) can make a sunset margarita (so named because the orange is at the top and the red at the bottom). Many recipes call for a splash of orange juice. These days, margaritas can be prepared in many different ways. When the word "margarita" is used by itself, it typically refers to the lime or lemon juice margarita. Still, when other juices are used, the fruits are typically added as adjectives in the name, with lime juice or lemon juice added to give it a characteristic margarita flavor (a wedge of lime is often added to the glass). Other varieties of margarita include fruit margarita, top-shelf margarita, and virgin margarita.

Coconut cream, coconut milk, and coconut water can also be added to margaritas, e.g., skinny margaritas that substitute, e.g., pineapple juice for liqueurs.

Margaritas can also be made with vegetables such as carrots, beets, cucumber, and celery.

=== Beer cocktails ===
A beergarita (or Coronarita) is a beer cocktail that has a bottle of Corona beer or other light-flavored beer poured upside down into a margarita on the rocks.

=== Skinny ===
A skinny margarita (or a skinny girl margarita), is a purportedly lower calorie (possibly using artificial sweeteners) and lower sugar agave sweetened triple-secs like Grand Marnier or Flor de Azar. The origin recipe, developed by Bethenny Frankel in 2008, consists of 1.5 oz of premium tequila, four squeezed limes, and a "splash" of Cointreau (triple sec).

Other recipes use fresh lime juice, orange juice, and agave nectar.

Another recipe uses only tequila and some concentrated lime juice.

=== Spicy ===
A spicy margarita is a variation that incorporates chili peppers or other spicy ingredients. It is usually made with tequila, lime juice, and orange liqueur, with heat typically added through fresh peppers (such as jalapeño or serrano) or a chili bitters, such as Caliente Bitters. The drink balances spiciness with acidity and sweetness and is often garnished with chili salt, a pepper slice, or lime. The spicy margarita became popular in the early 21st century and is commonly featured on contemporary cocktail menus.

== Related drinks ==
A margarita with vodka substituted for tequila is a kamikaze.

== Glass ==
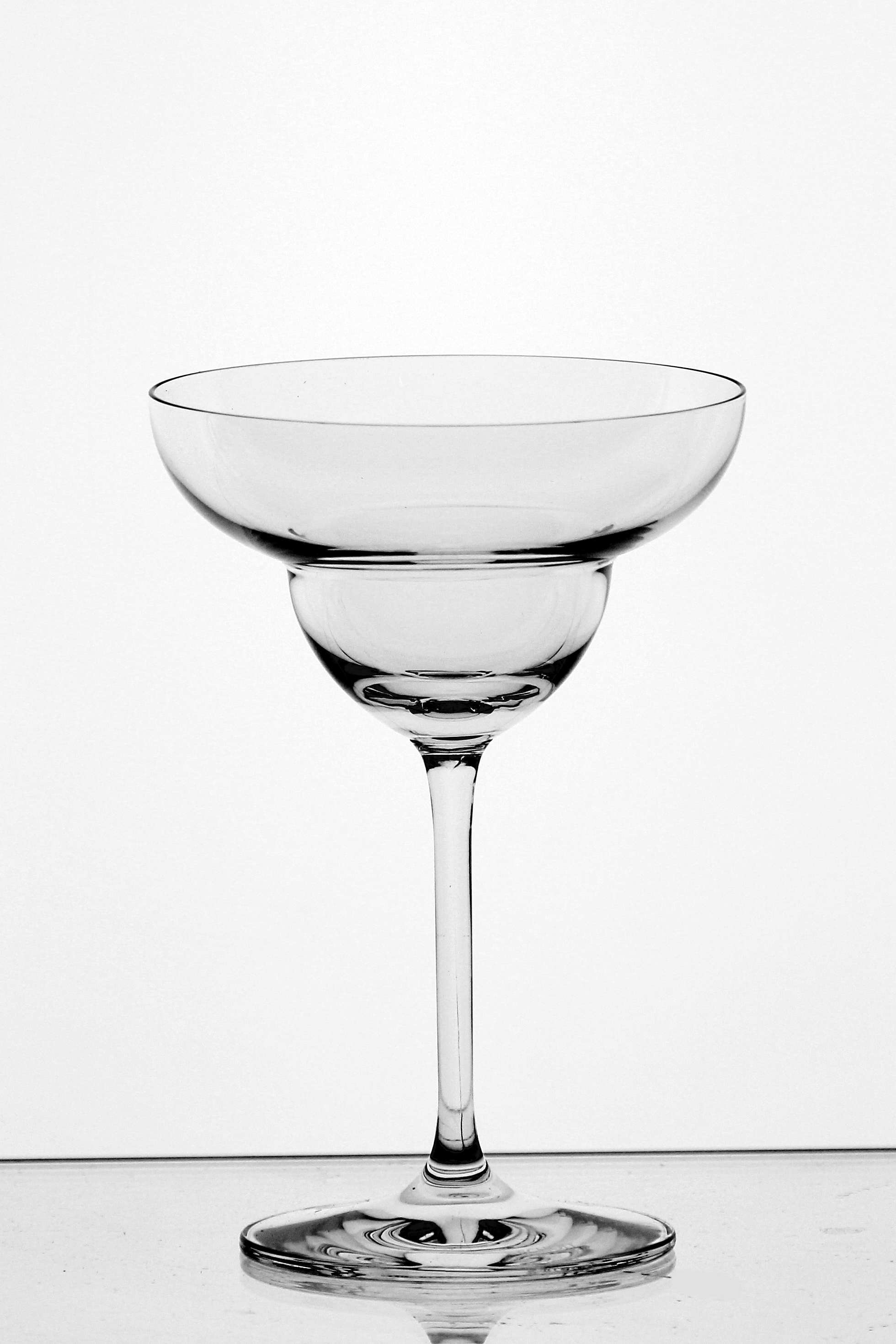
A traditional margarita glass

Margaritas may be served in a variety of glasses, most notably the margarita glass, a variant of the classic champagne coupe; this is particularly associated with blended fruit margaritas, and the glass is also used for dishes such as guacamole or shrimp cocktails. Margaritas are often served in a standard cocktail glass in formal settings. In contrast, in informal settings, particularly with ice, margaritas may be served in an old fashioned glass, cocktail glass, wine glass, pint glass, and even large schooners.

== Popularity ==
The margarita cocktail was the December 1953 "Drink of the Month" in Esquire magazine, with this recipe:

1 ounce tequila
Dash of triple sec
Juice of 1/2 lime or lemon

Pour over crushed ice, stir. Rub the rim of a stem glass with rind of lemon or lime, spin in salt—pour, and sip.

It was further popularized by the 1977 song "Margaritaville" by Jimmy Buffett. In 2004 it was described as "the most popular mixed drink in America". It was used in the title of the 1983 single "Marguerita Time" by the British rock band Status Quo and was the inspiration for the cover artwork.

The margarita may be popular because it includes salt, sweet, and sour flavors.

== See also ==
- List of cocktails
- Mexican martini
- Paloma
- Tommy's margarita
