= Cuale River =

River in Jalisco, Mexico

Cuale River Río Cuale
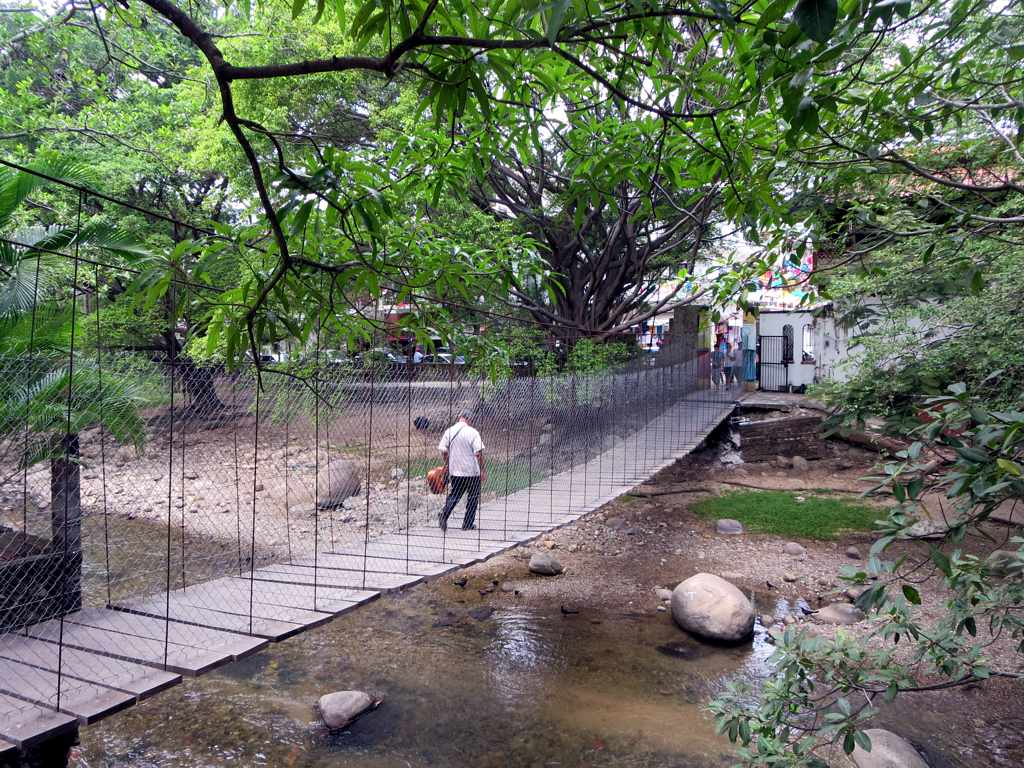
- A bridge over the river in Puerto Vallarta, 2014

Physical characteristics
- Source: Sierra el Cuale
- Mouth
  - location: Puerto Vallarta

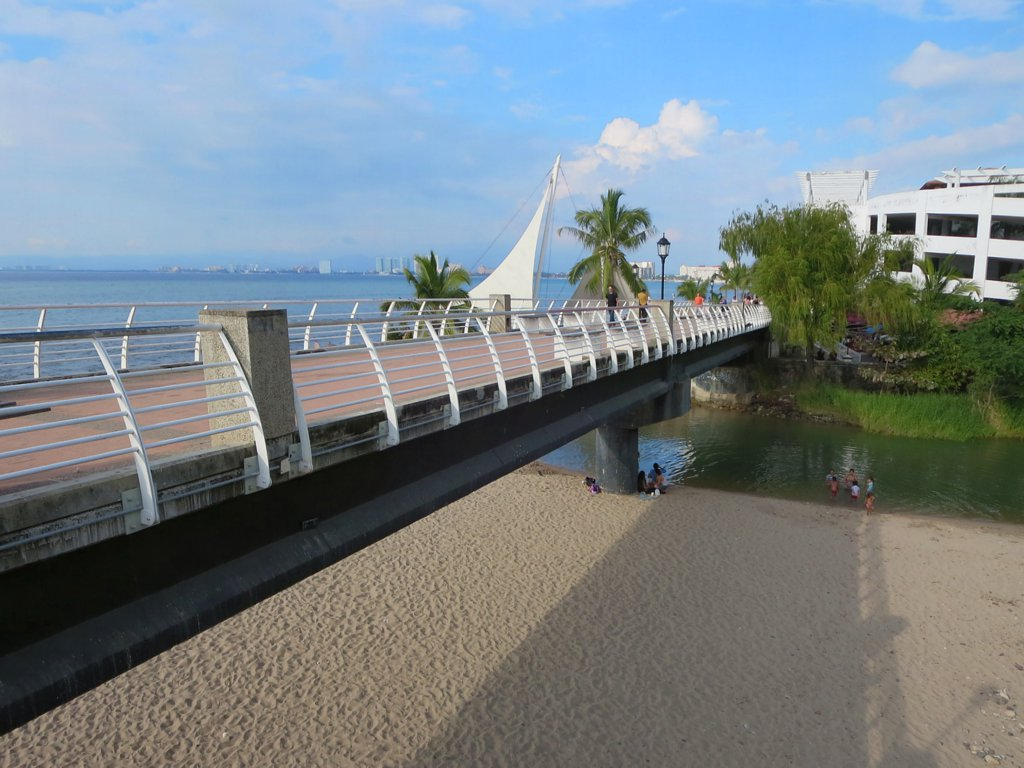
Crossing over the river at Puerto Vallarta's Malecón, 2014

The Cuale River is a river in Jalisco, Mexico. It originates in the Sierra el Cuale, and flows northwestwards to empty into the Pacific Ocean in Puerto Vallarta.

Isla Cuale is an island at the river's mouth.
