= GAYPV =

LGBTQ+ digital publication

- Editor: Tim Wilson
- Format: Digital publication
- Founder: Tim Wilson
- Founded: November 2011
- Based in: Puerto Vallarta, Mexico
- Language: English
- Website: www.gaypv.com

GAYPV is an English-language LGBTQ+ digital publication based in Puerto Vallarta, Mexico, founded by Tim Wilson in November 2011. The publication covers Puerto Vallarta's LGBTQ+ scene with event calendars, a gay business directory, and travel planning information.

== History and media coverage ==
In 2012 GAYPV interviewed Puerto Vallarta Director of Tourism José Luis Díaz Borioli discussing Puerto Vallarta LGBTQ+ tourism.

GAYPV joined a business group in 2013 and became one of the organizing founders of Puerto Vallarta's first Vallarta Pride celebration, and continued to serve on the Vallarta Pride Committee through 2019.

GAYPV contributed monthly LGBTQ+-focused articles for the Puerto Vallarta Tourism Board's digital magazine during 2016 and 2017.

GAYPV is a primary reference of information for the Puerto Vallarta gay scene for media outlets like Edge Media Network, Bay Area Reporter, and TravelAge West.

The publication provides event photography for various outlets like The Advocate, Out, and OutTraveler for Puerto Vallarta Bear Week, Vallarta Pride, and White Party PV.
