= List of public art in Puerto Vallarta =

List of public artworks in Puerto Vallarta, Mexico

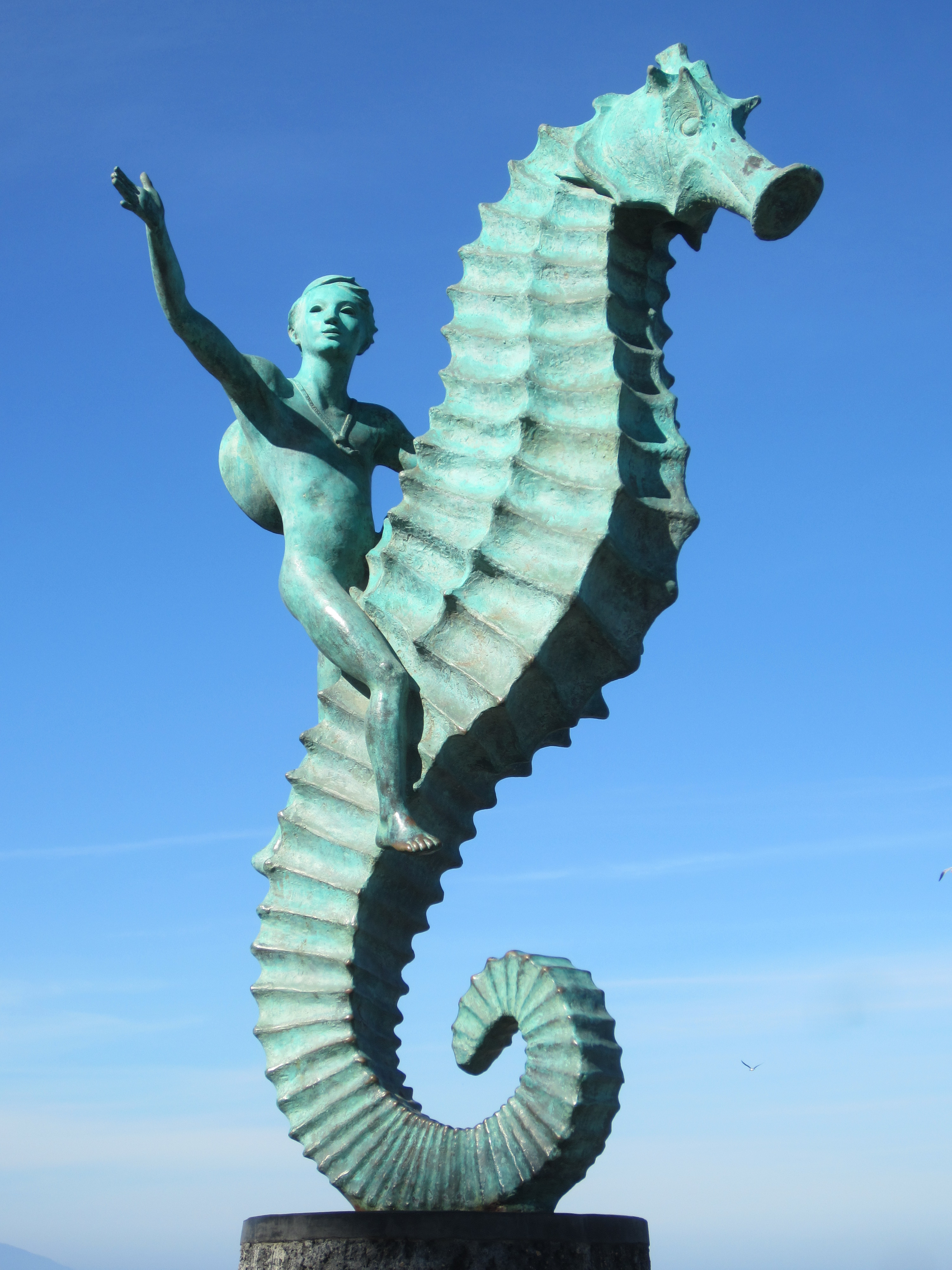
The Boy on the Seahorse

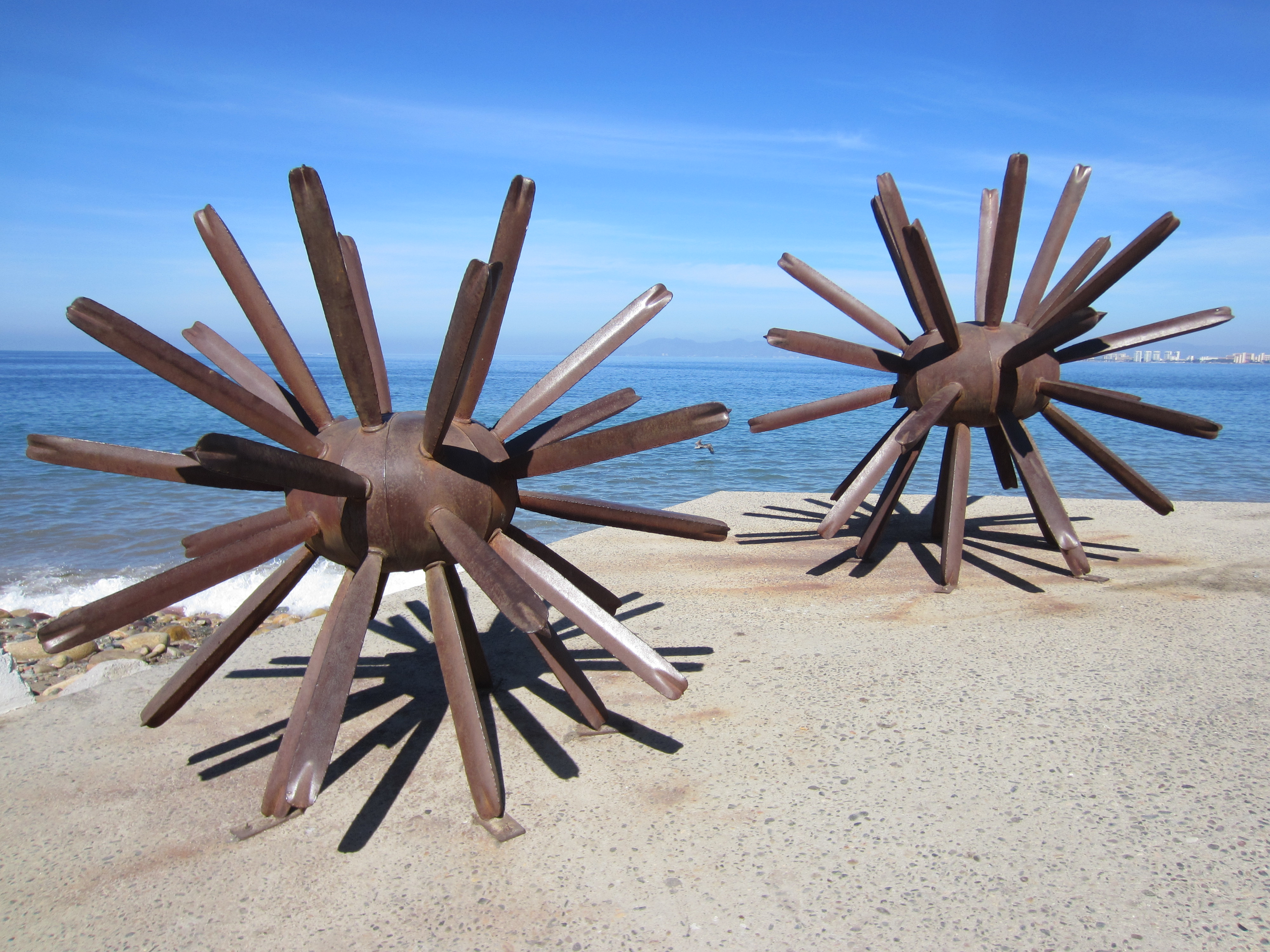
Erizados

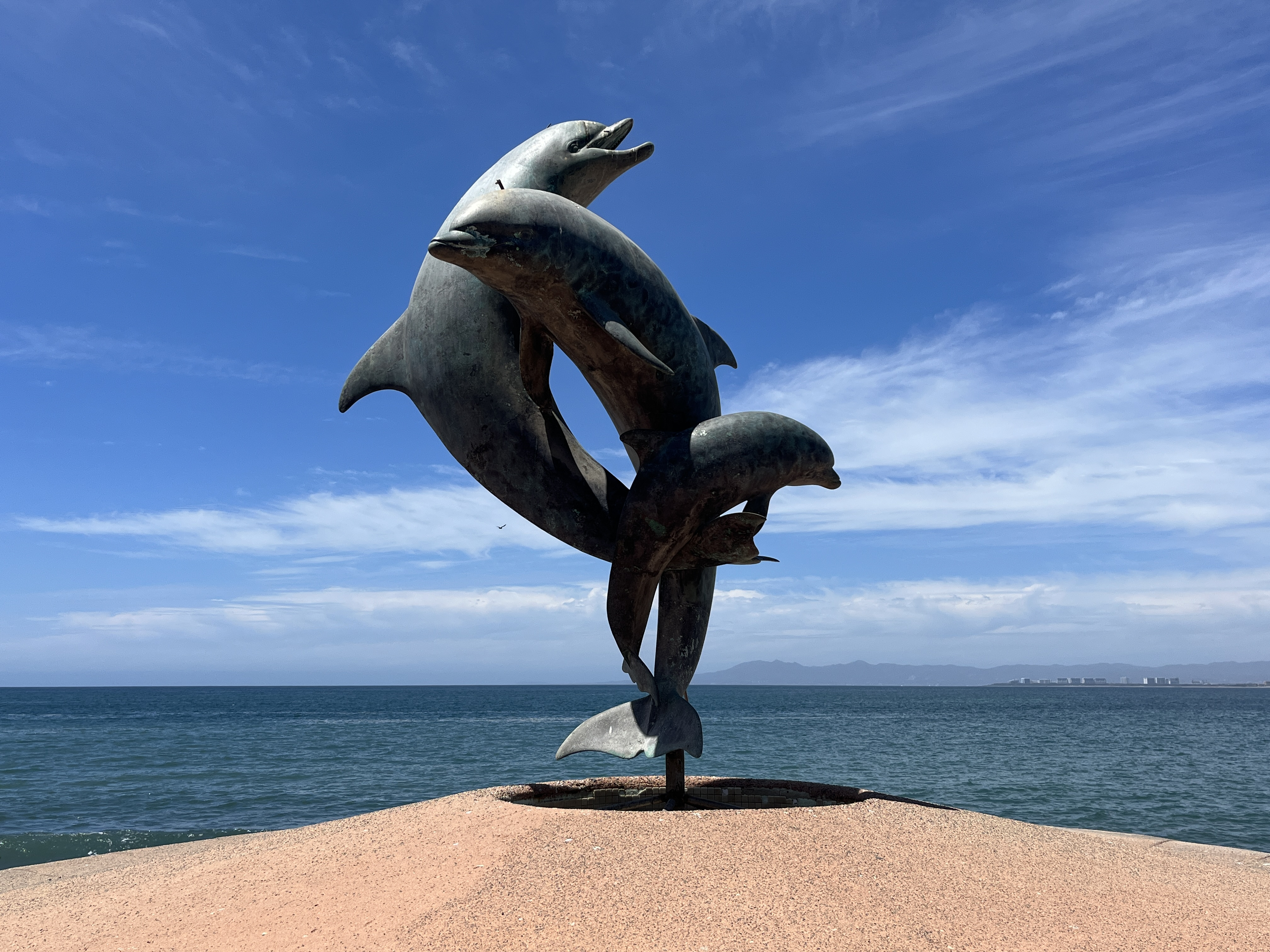
Friendship Fountain

Puerto Vallarta, in the Mexican state of Jalisco, has an extensive public art collection. Works include:

- Ándale Bernardo by Jim Demetro, Lázaro Cárdenas Park
- Ballena Vallarta
- The Boy on the Seahorse (Spanish: "El niño sobre el caballito de mar") by Rafael Zamarripa
- Elizabeth Taylor and Richard Burton (2015)
- Erizados by Maritza Vazquez, Malecón
- The Fish Sellers' Mosaic by Manuel Lepe
- The Fisherman (Spanish: "El Pescador") by Ramiz Barquet, Centro and Zona Romántica
- The Fishermen (Spanish: "Los Pescadores") by Jim and Christina Demetro, Zona Romántica
- Friendship Fountain (Spanish: "La fuente de la amistad") by James "Bud" Bottoms and Octavio González, Malecón
- The Good Fortune Unicorn (Spanish: "El Unicornio de la Buena Fortuna") by Anibal Riebeling, Malecón
- Identidad (2019) by Marta Gilbert
- In Search of Reason (Spanish: "En busca de la razón") by Sergio Bustamante, Malecón
- Las Orcas
- The Minstrel's Corner
- Monumento de la Dama Desnuda
- Nature as Mother (Spanish: "Naturaleza como madre") by Adrián Reynoso, Malecón
- Nostalgia (Spanish: "La nostalgia") by Ramiz Barquet, Malecón
- Millennium by Mathis Lidice, Malecón
- Origin and Destination (Spanish: "Origen y destino") by Pedro Tello, Malecón
- Rain (Spanish: "Lluvia") by Jovian, Malecón
- The Rotunda by the Sea (Spanish: "La rotonda del mar") by Alejandro Colunga, Malecón
- Salud by Jim Demetro
- Statue of Francis of Assisi
- Statue of Ignacio Vallarta, Plaza de Armas
- Statue of John Huston, Isla Cuale
- Statue of Lázaro Cárdenas, Lázaro Cárdenas Park
- Statue of Lorena Ochoa, Marina Vallarta Golf Club
- Statue of Miguel Hidalgo y Costilla, Plaza Hidalgo
- Statue of Paschal Baylón, Malecón
- The Subtle Stone Eater (Spanish: "El sutil comepiedras") by Jonás Gutiérrez, Malecón
- Tritón y Sirena by Carlos Espino, Malecón
- Vallarta Dancers (Spanish: "Bailarines de Vallarta") by Jim Demetro, Malecón
- Victoria del Bicentenario
- The Washer Woman (Spanish: "La Mujer Lavando") by Jim Demetro, Malecón
