= Malecón, Puerto Vallarta =

Esplanade in Puerto Vallarta, Jalisco, Mexico

The Malecón
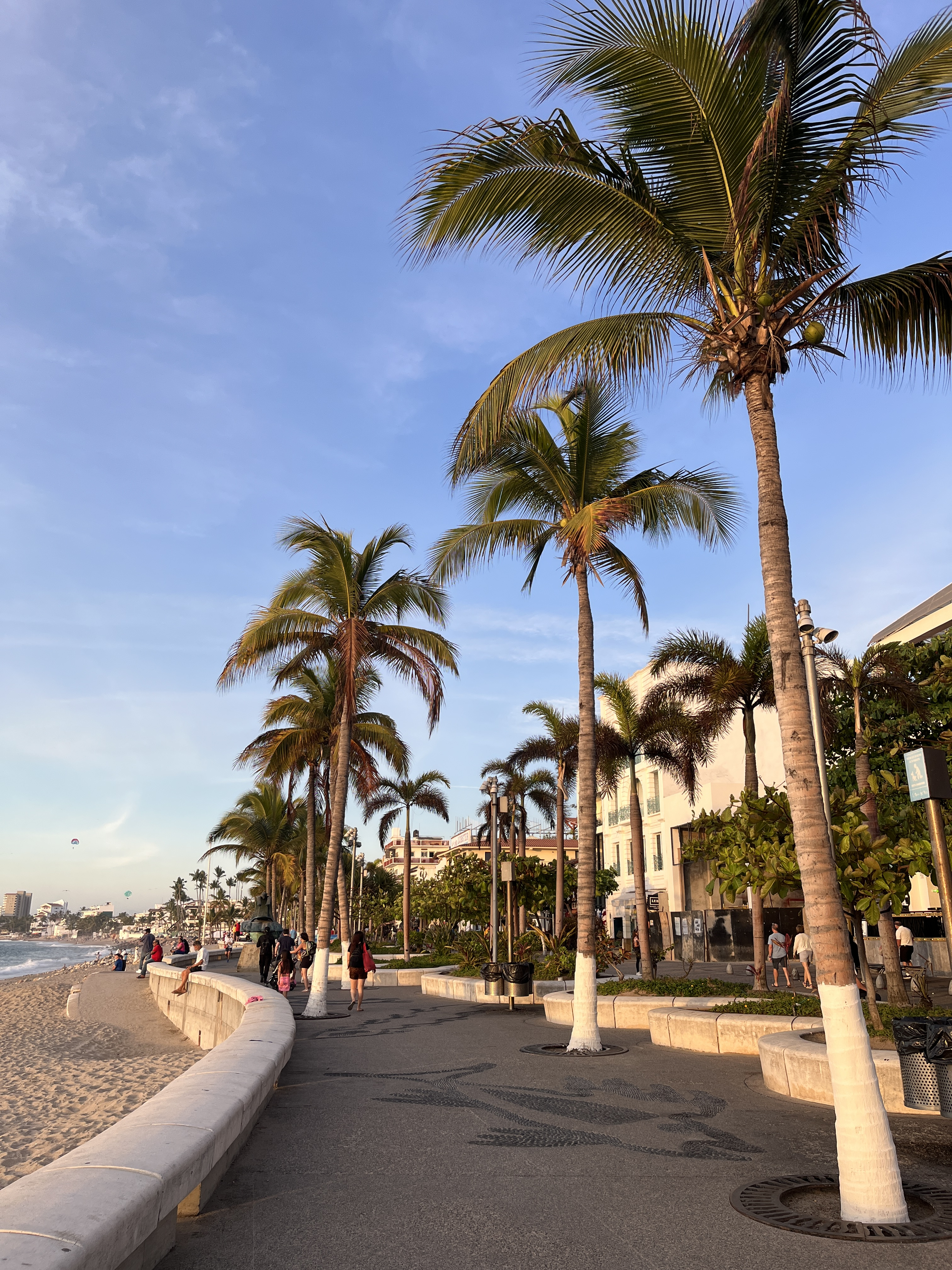
- The Malecón in 2023
- Interactive map of The Malecón
- Location: Puerto Vallarta, Jalisco, Mexico
- Coordinates: 20°36′52.955″N 105°13′59.509″W

The Malecón is a 12-block, mile-long esplanade in Puerto Vallarta's Centro and Zona Romántica, in the Mexican state of Jalisco. The waterfront crosses the Cuale River via Puente Río Cuale.

Built between 1935 and 1936, it was expanded between 1940 and 1952. In 2002, the Malecón was destroyed by Hurricane Kenna. After 9 years of repairs, the Malecón was reopened with a wider pedestrian walkway.

On the Malecón there are several restaurants, clothing stores, jewelry stores, and craft vendors. Among the features of the place are Los Arcos, the Malecón Lighthouse, and a collection of sculptures.

== Sculptures ==
The walkway has featured numerous sculptures, including:

- The Boy on the Seahorse (Spanish: "El niño sobre el caballito de mar") by Rafael Zamarripa
- Erizados (2006) by Maritza Vazquez
- The Fish Sellers' Mosaic by Manuel Lepe
- Friendship Fountain (Spanish: "La fuente de la amistad") by James "Bud" Bottoms and Octavio González
- The Good Fortune Unicorn (Spanish: "El Unicornio de la Buena Fortuna") by Anibal Riebeling
- In Search of Reason (Spanish: "En busca de la razón") by Sergio Bustamante
- Millennium (2001) by Mathis Lidice
- Nature as Mother by Adrián Reynoso
- Nostalgia (Spanish: "La nostalgia") by Ramiz Barquet
- Origin and Destination (Spanish: "Origen y destino") by Pedro Tello
- Rain by Jovian
- The Rotunda by the Sea (Spanish: "La rotonda del mar") by Alejandro Colunga
- Statue of Lorena Ochoa (installed in 2012; later relocated to Marina Vallarta Golf Club)
- Statue of Paschal Baylón by Ramiz Barquet
- The Subtle Stone Eater (Spanish: "El sutil comepiedras") by Jonás Gutiérrez
- Tritón y Sirena (1990) by Carlos Espino
- Vallarta Dancers by Jim Demetro
- The Washer Woman by Jim Demetro
