= The Fisherman (Puerto Vallarta) =

1996 bronze sculpture by Ramiz Barquet, installed in Puerto Vallarta, Mexico

- El Pescador (Spanish)
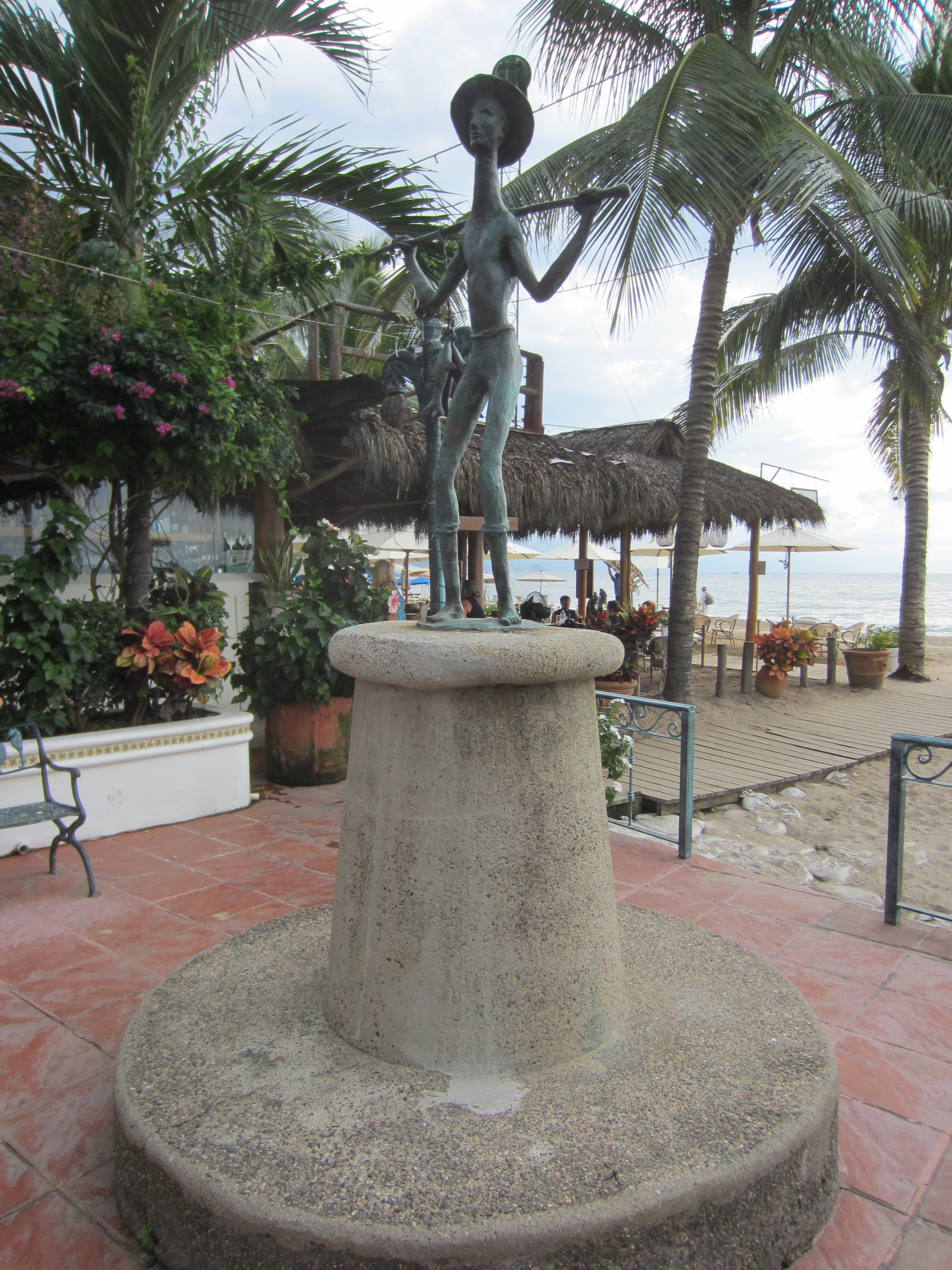
- The sculpture along the Malecón in Zona Romántica in 2021
- Artist: Ramiz Barquet
- Year: 1996
- Medium: Bronze sculpture
- Subject: Fisherman
- Location: Puerto Vallarta, Jalisco, Mexico; 20°36′23″N 105°14′05″W

The Fisherman (Spanish: "El Pescador") is a sculpture of a bare-footed fisherman named Isidro by Mexican artist Ramiz Barquet. Two copies are installed in Puerto Vallarta, in the Mexican state of Jalisco. The sculpture has been described as "a leading visual symbol" of the city. The bronze sculpture in Centro was completed in 1996, and dedicated on January 12, 1996. Another statue is installed along the Malecón in Zona Romántica.

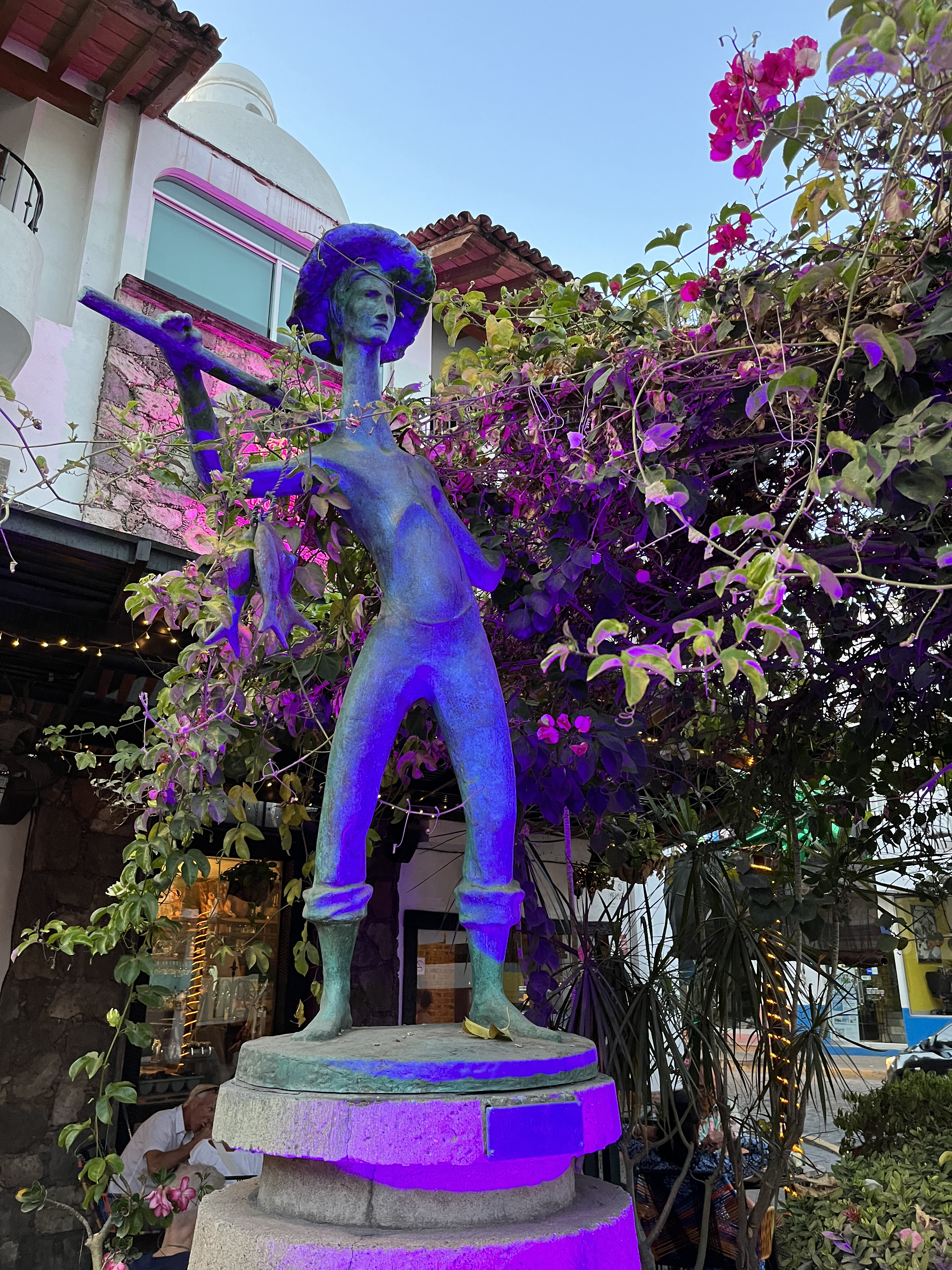
The sculpture in Centro, 2023
