= Malecón Lighthouse =

Defunct lighthouse in Puerto Vallarta, Jalisco, Mexico

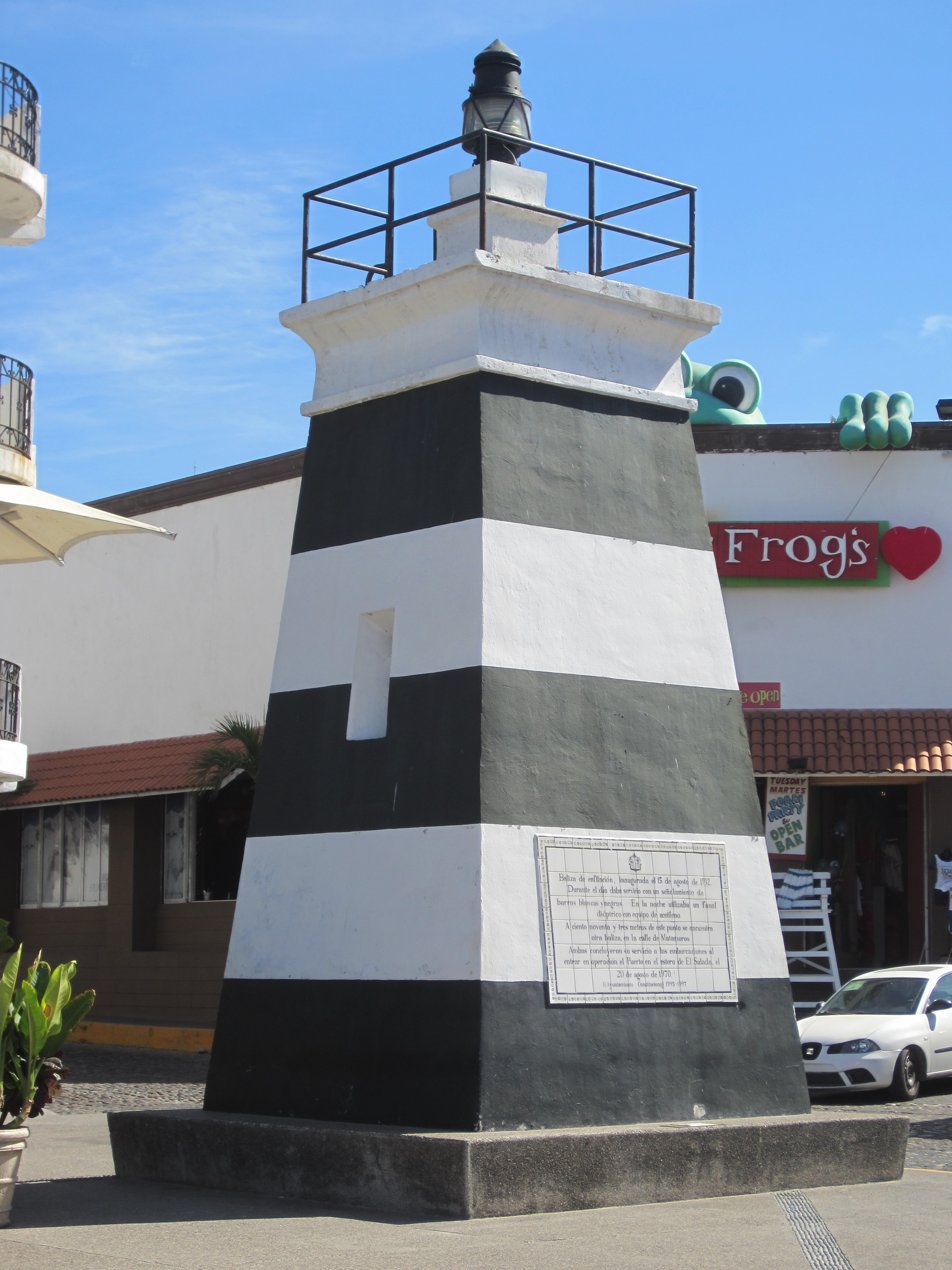
- Location: Puerto Vallarta, Jalisco, Mexico
- Coordinates: 20°36′37″N 105°14′05″W

Tower
- Constructed: 1932
- Height: 10 m (33 ft)
- Shape: square pyramid
- Markings: black, white

Light
- First lit: 15 August 1932
- Deactivated: 1970

Malecón Lighthouse (Spanish: "Faro de Malecón", also known simply as "El Faro") is a defunct lighthouse along the Malecón in Centro, Puerto Vallarta, in the Mexican state of Jalisco.
