= The Boy on the Seahorse =

Sculpture by Rafael Zamarripa

- Spanish: El niño sobre el caballito de mar
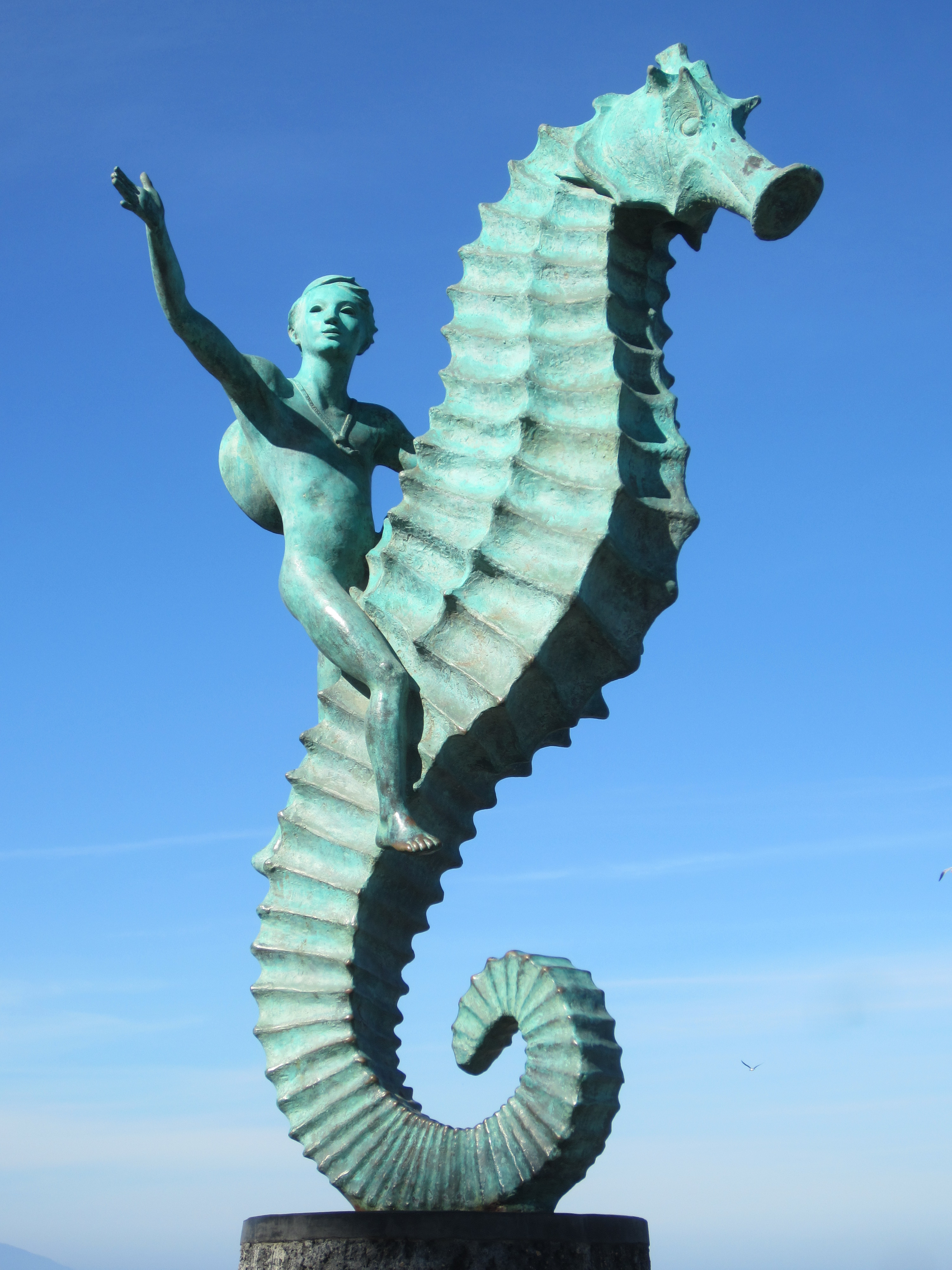
- The sculpture in 2014
- Artist: Rafael Zamarripa
- Location: Puerto Vallarta, Mexico
- 20°36′33.7″N 105°14′8″W

The Boy on the Seahorse (Spanish: "El niño sobre el caballito de mar"), commonly known as El caballito, is a sculpture by Rafael Zamarripa. Two versions are installed in Puerto Vallarta, in the Mexican state of Jalisco; one along the Malecón in Centro and another at Playa de los Muertos in Zona Romántica.

One of the existing sculptures along the Malecón, installed in 1976, replaced a smaller version which was erected at Playa de los Muertos in the late 1960s but later swept away by a storm. The work has been described as an icon of the city.
