= Erizados =

2006 sculpture by Maritza Vazquez

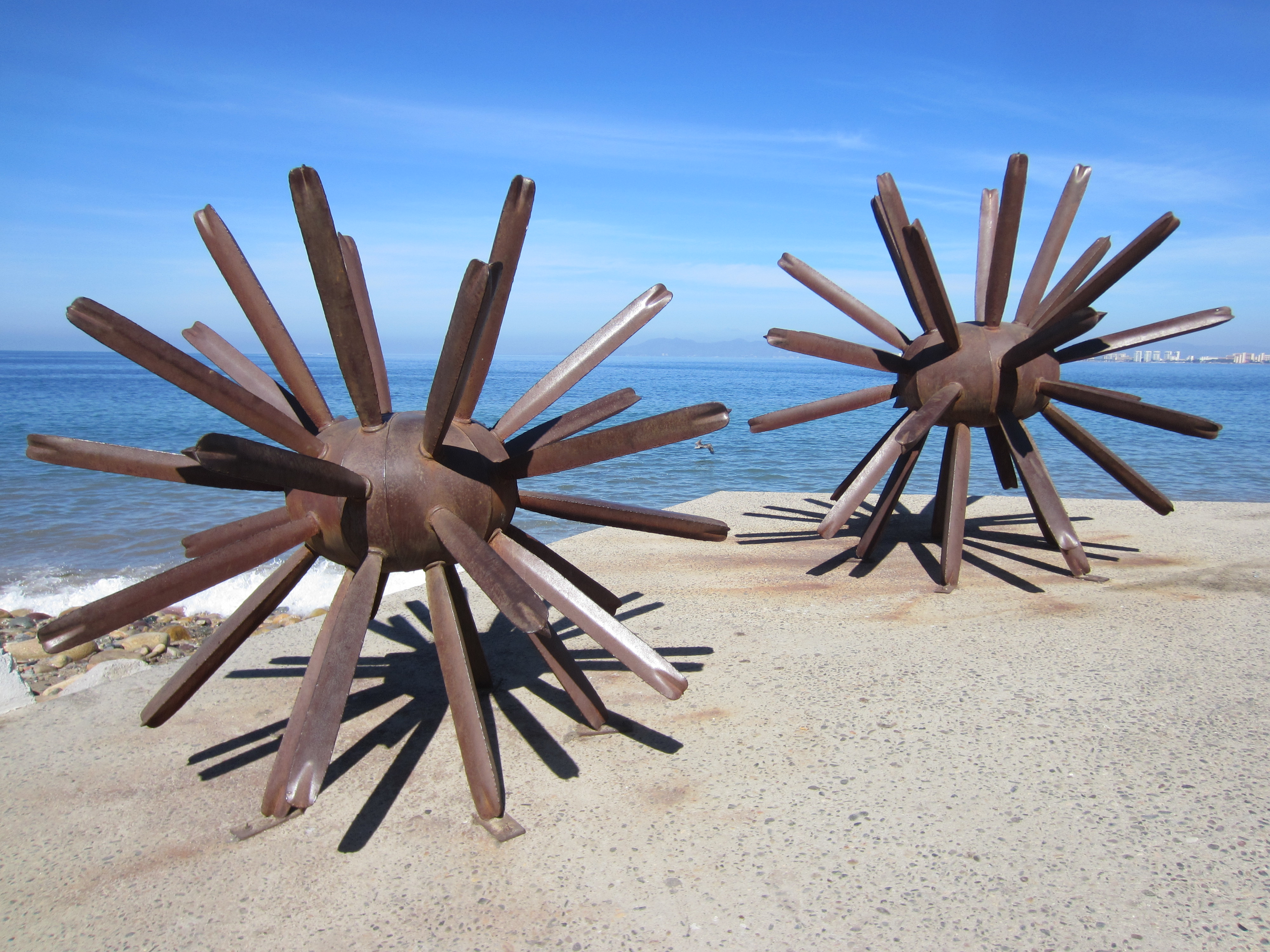
- The artwork in 2014
- Artist: Maritza Vazquez
- Year: 2006
- Medium: Steel sculpture
- Location: Puerto Vallarta, Jalisco, Mexico
- 20°36′28.9″N 105°14′13.1″W

Erizados, also known as Two Rising Up, is a 2006 welded steel sculpture by Maritza Vazquez, installed along Puerto Vallarta's Malecón, in the Mexican state of Jalisco. The work depicts two sea urchins, and was originally constructed from a thinner material which was unable to withstand the elements.

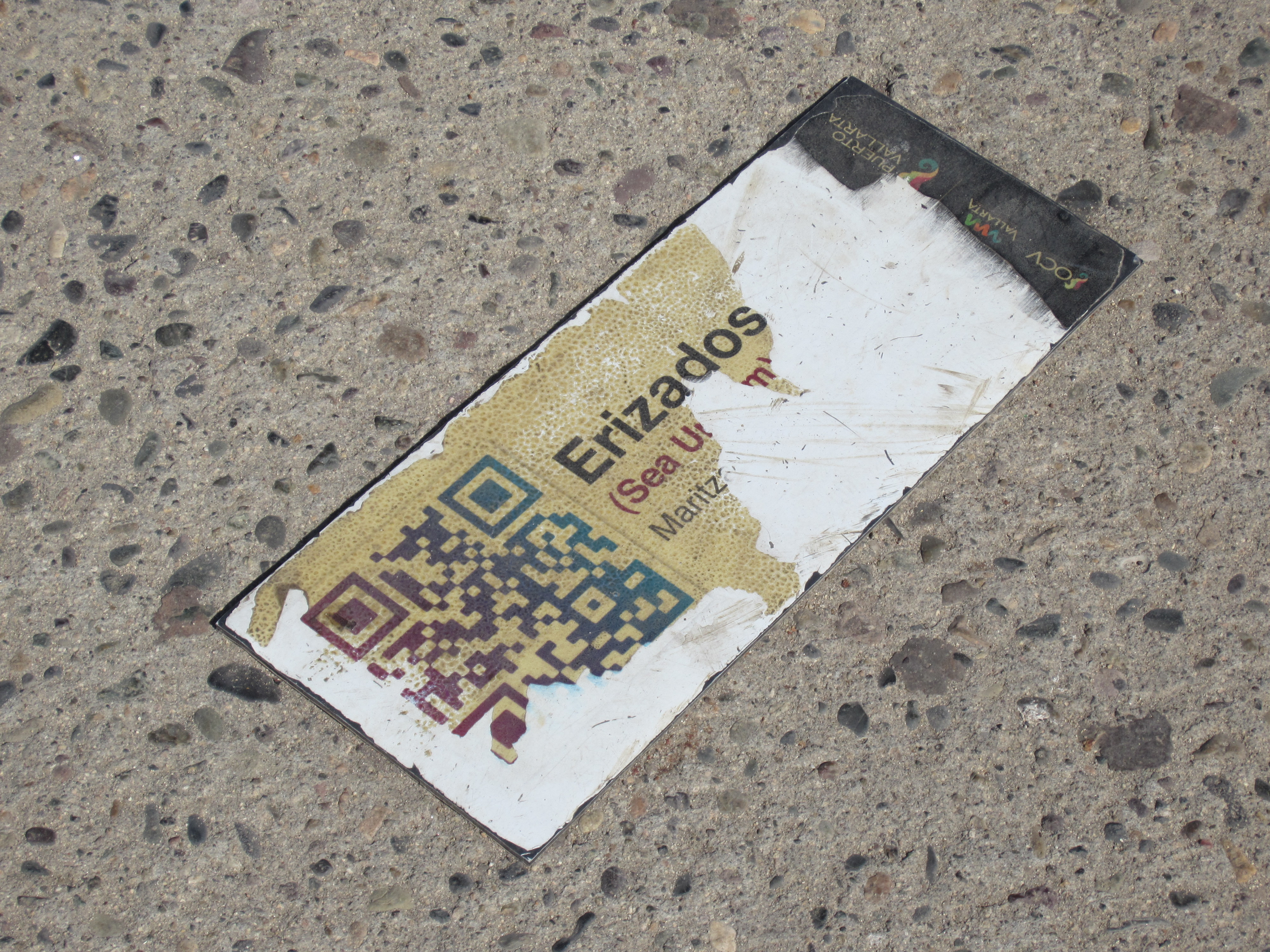
Plaque, 2014

== See also ==
- 2006 in art
