= Monumento de la Dama Desnuda =

Statue in Puerto Vallarta, Jalisco, Mexico

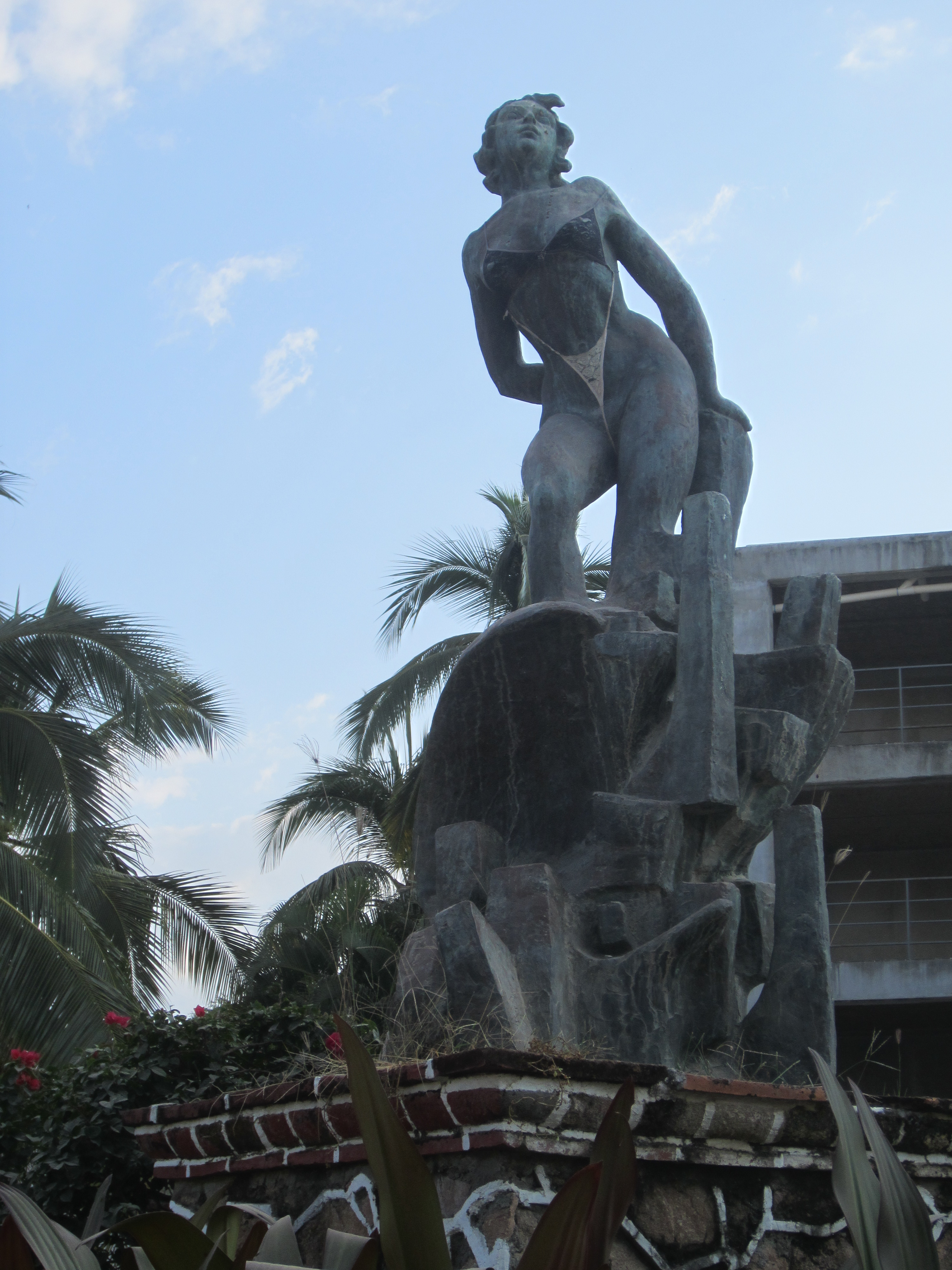
- The sculpture in 2021
- Location: Puerto Vallarta, Jalisco, Mexico
- 20.6296°N 105.2314°W

Monumento de la Dama Desnuda is a statue of a nude woman, installed in Puerto Vallarta, in the Mexican state of Jalisco.
