= Millennium (sculpture) =

2001 sculpture in Puerto Vallarta, Mexico

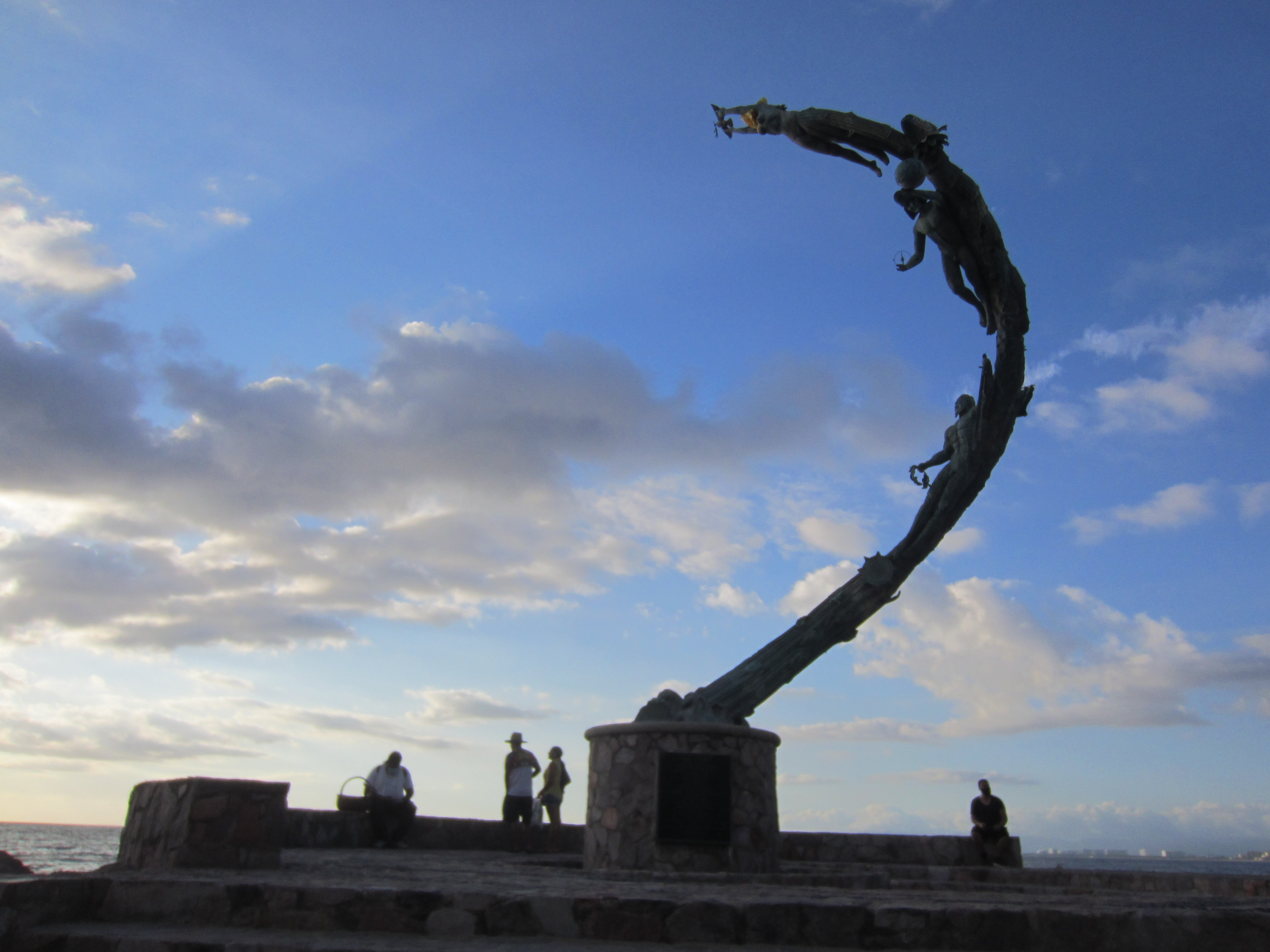
- The sculpture in 2021
- Artist: Mathis Lidice
- Year: 2001
- Location: Puerto Vallarta, Jalisco, Mexico
- 20°36′53″N 105°13′59.5″W

Millennium (Spanish: "El Milenio") is a 2001 sculpture by Mathis Lidice (also known as Félix Fernando Baños López), installed at the north end of Puerto Vallarta's Malecón, in the Mexican state of Jalisco.

According to Fodor's, the artwork "represents history and the passage of time. DNA at its base depicts the origin of life and the dove of peace at the top symbolizes hope for the future". Historical figures are also incorporated in the design, including Charlemagne and Nezahualcoyotl.

== See also ==
- 2001 in art
