= Tritón y Sirena =

Sculpture in Puerto Vallarta, Jalisco, Mexico

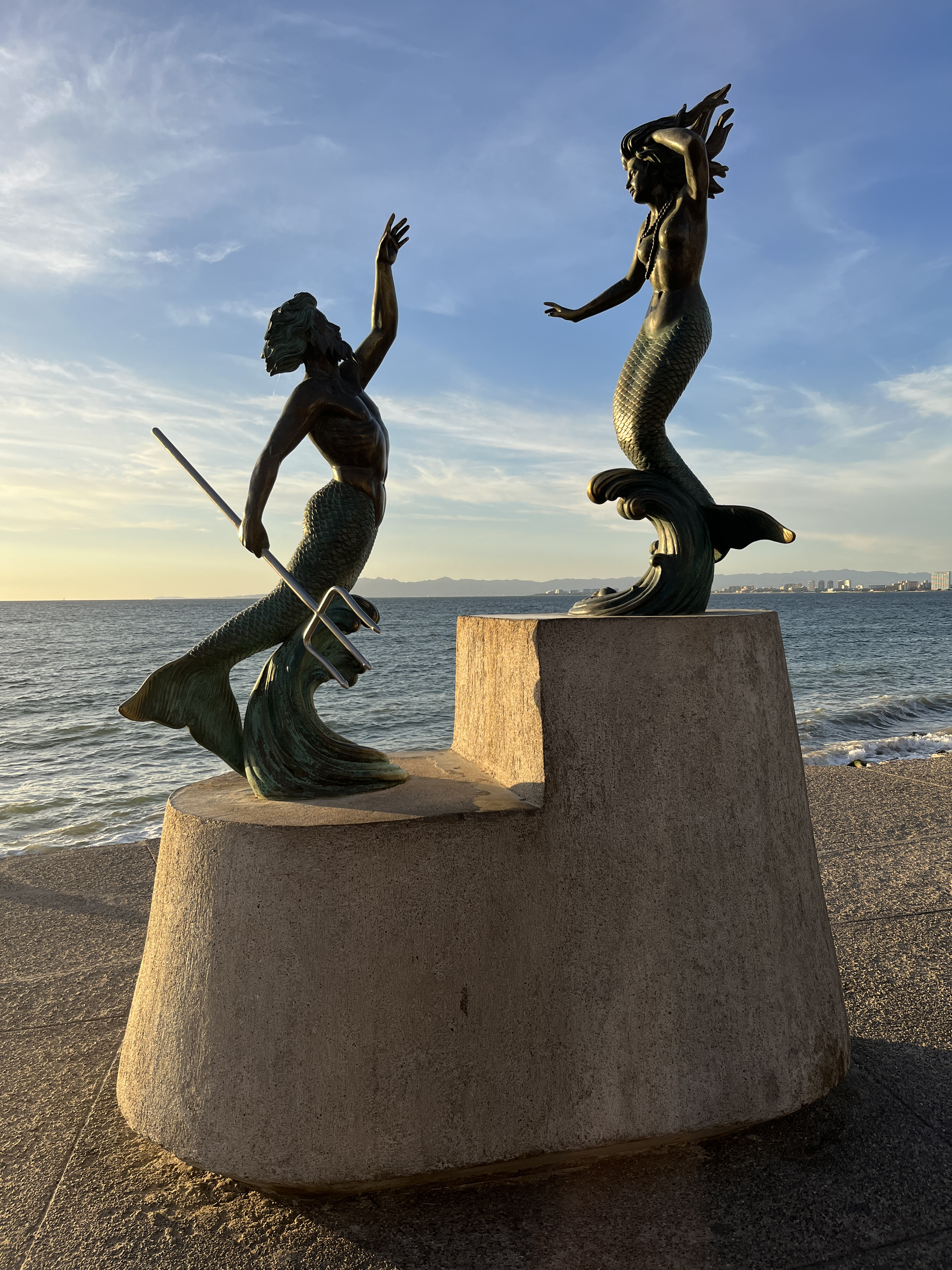
- The sculpture in 2023
- Artist: Carlos Espino
- Year: 1990
- Location: Puerto Vallarta, Jalisco, Mexico
- 20°36′35″N 105°14′6.9″W

Tritón y Sirena (also known as Tritón y Nereida) is a sculpture by Carlos Espino, installed along Puerto Vallarta's Malecón, in the Mexican state of Jalisco. Installed the 1990, the artwork depicts Triton (son of Poseidon and Amphitrite) and a Siren (sometimes considered a Nereid).

== See also ==
- 1990 in art
- Greek mythology in popular culture
