= Ballena Vallarta =

Bronze sculpture in Puerto Vallarta, Jalisco, Mexico

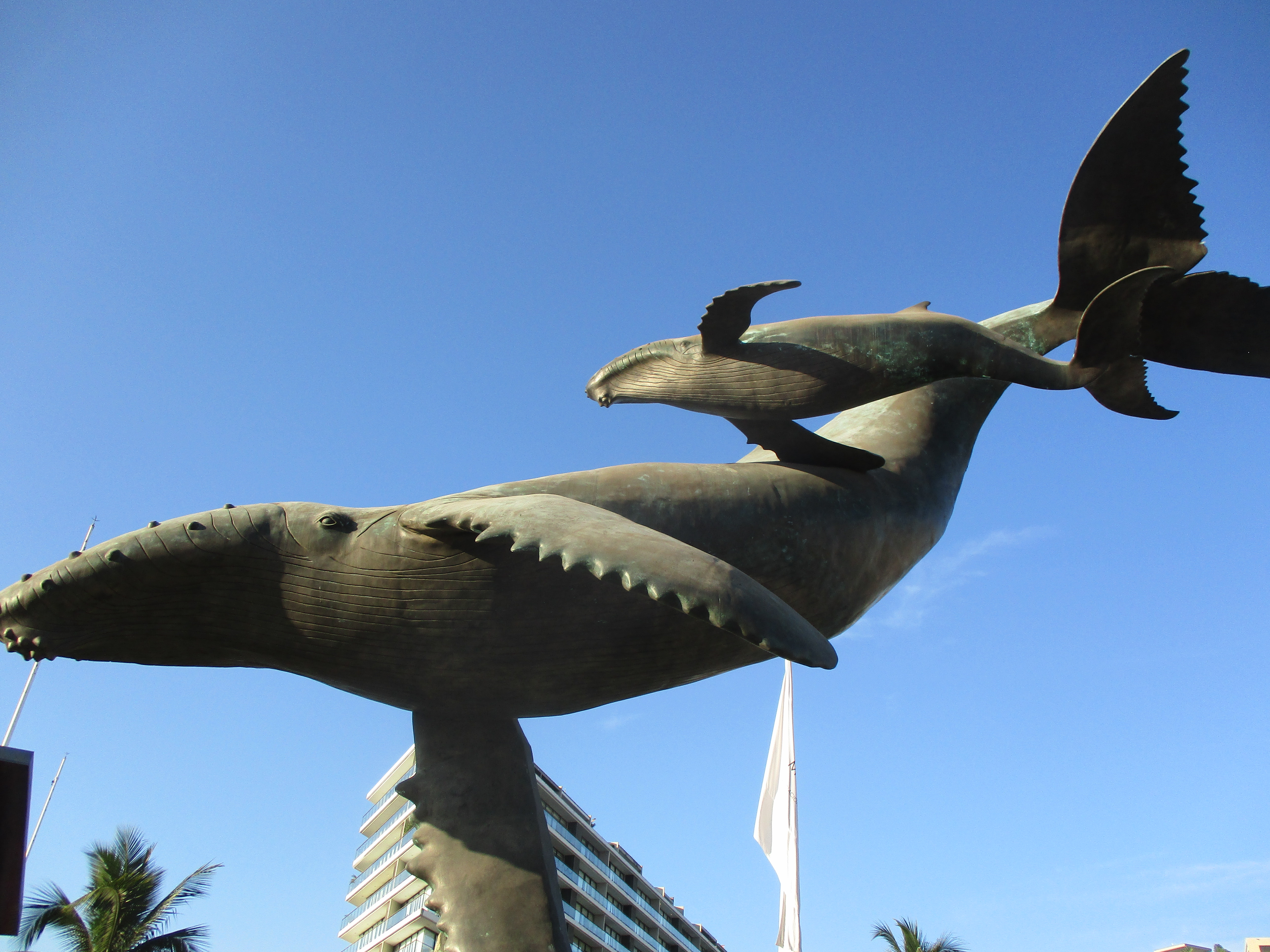
- The sculpture in 2022
- Artist: Octavio González
- Medium: Bronze sculpture
- Location: Puerto Vallarta, Jalisco, Mexico; 20.6684°N 105.2487°W

Ballena Vallarta is a bronze sculpture depicting two humpback whales by Octavio González, installed in Puerto Vallarta, in the Mexican state of Jalisco.
