= Nature as Mother =

Sculpture in Puerto Vallarta, Jalisco, Mexico

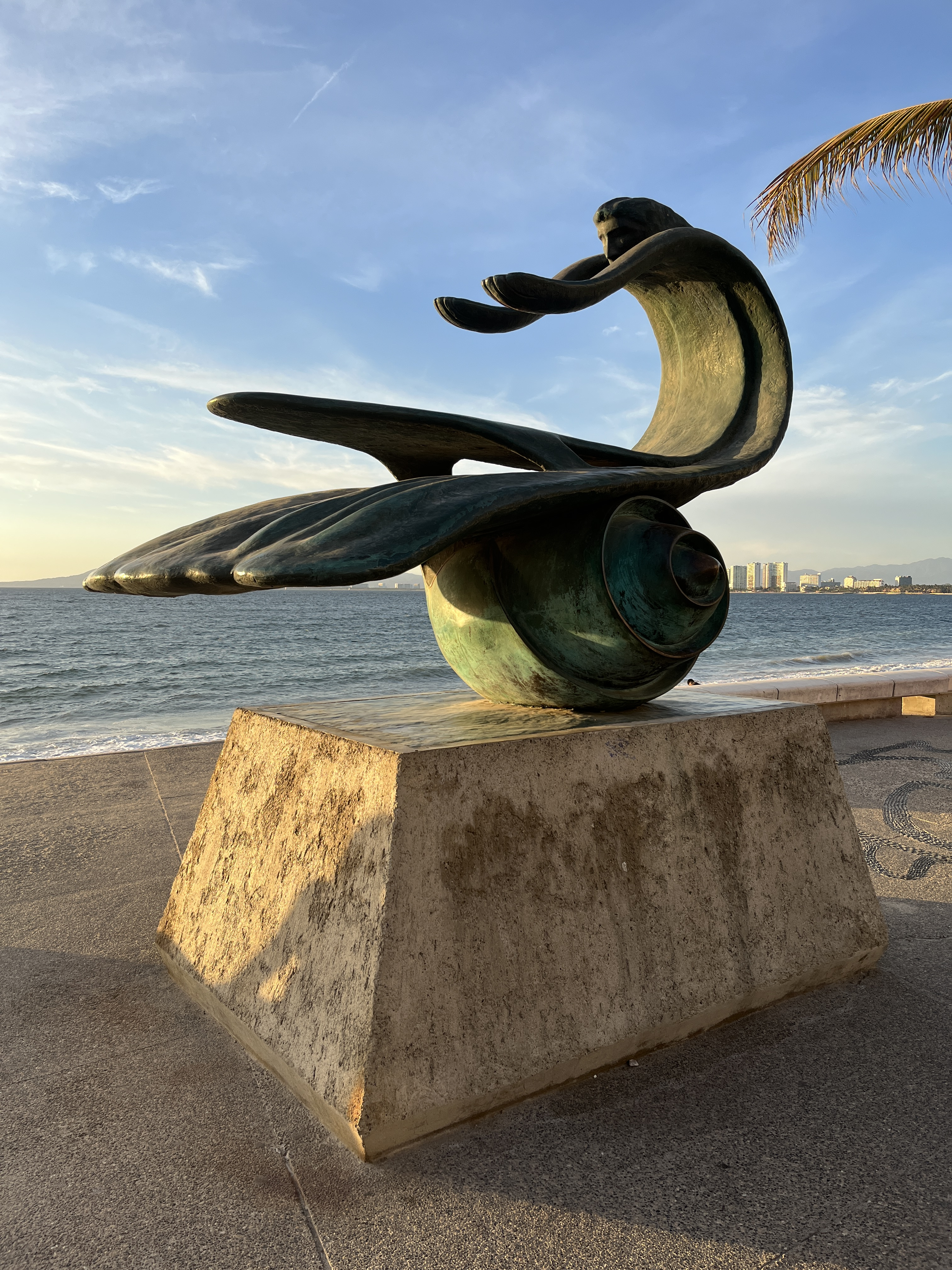
- The sculpture in 2023
- Artist: Adrian Reynoso
- Location: Puerto Vallarta, Jalisco, Mexico
- 20°36′42.9″N 105°14′3.7″W

Nature as Mother (Spanish: "La Naturaleza Como Madre") is an abstract sculpture by Adrian Reynoso, installed along Puerto Vallarta's Malecón, in the Mexican state of Jalisco. According to Fodor's, the artwork depicts "a wave with some human characteristics on a spiral shell and symbolizes the evolution of our planet with nature as the controlling force".
