= Origin and Destination =

2011 sculpture in Puerto Vallarta, Jalisco, Mexico

- Spanish: Origen y destino
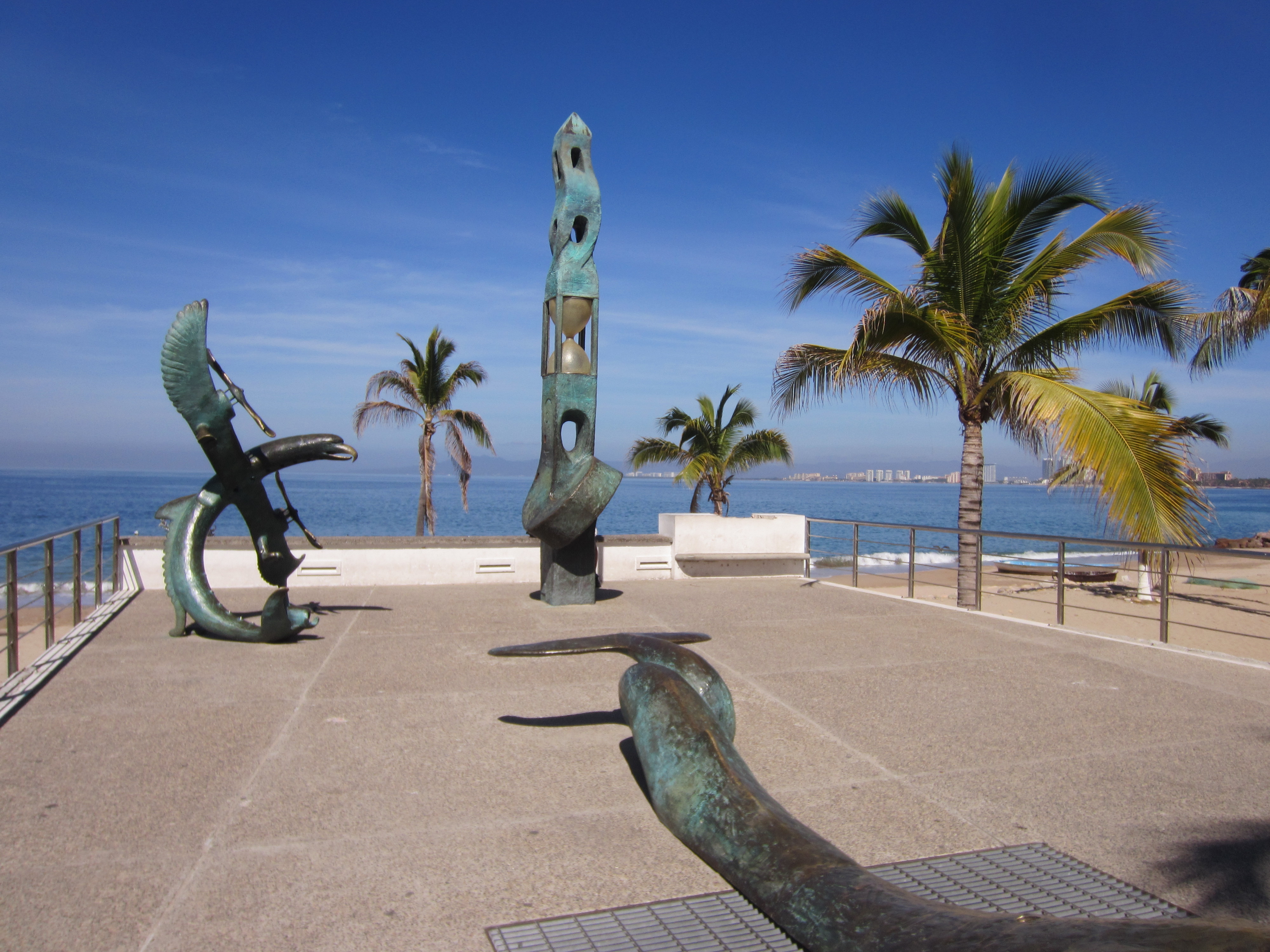
- The sculpture in 2014
- Artist: Pedro Tello
- Location: Puerto Vallarta, Jalisco, Mexico
- 20°36′49.9″N 105°13′59.8″W

Origin and Destination (Spanish: "Origen y destino") is a 2011 sculpture by Pedro Tello, installed along Puerto Vallarta's Malecón, in the Mexican state of Jalisco. According to Fodor's, the installation's five sculptures "represent the beginnings of humanity. The boat represents humanity's search for new horizons; the chimera depicts the rise of machines; the whale shows the rise of humanity in the new millennium; and the obelisk represents the work of humanity through time and history."

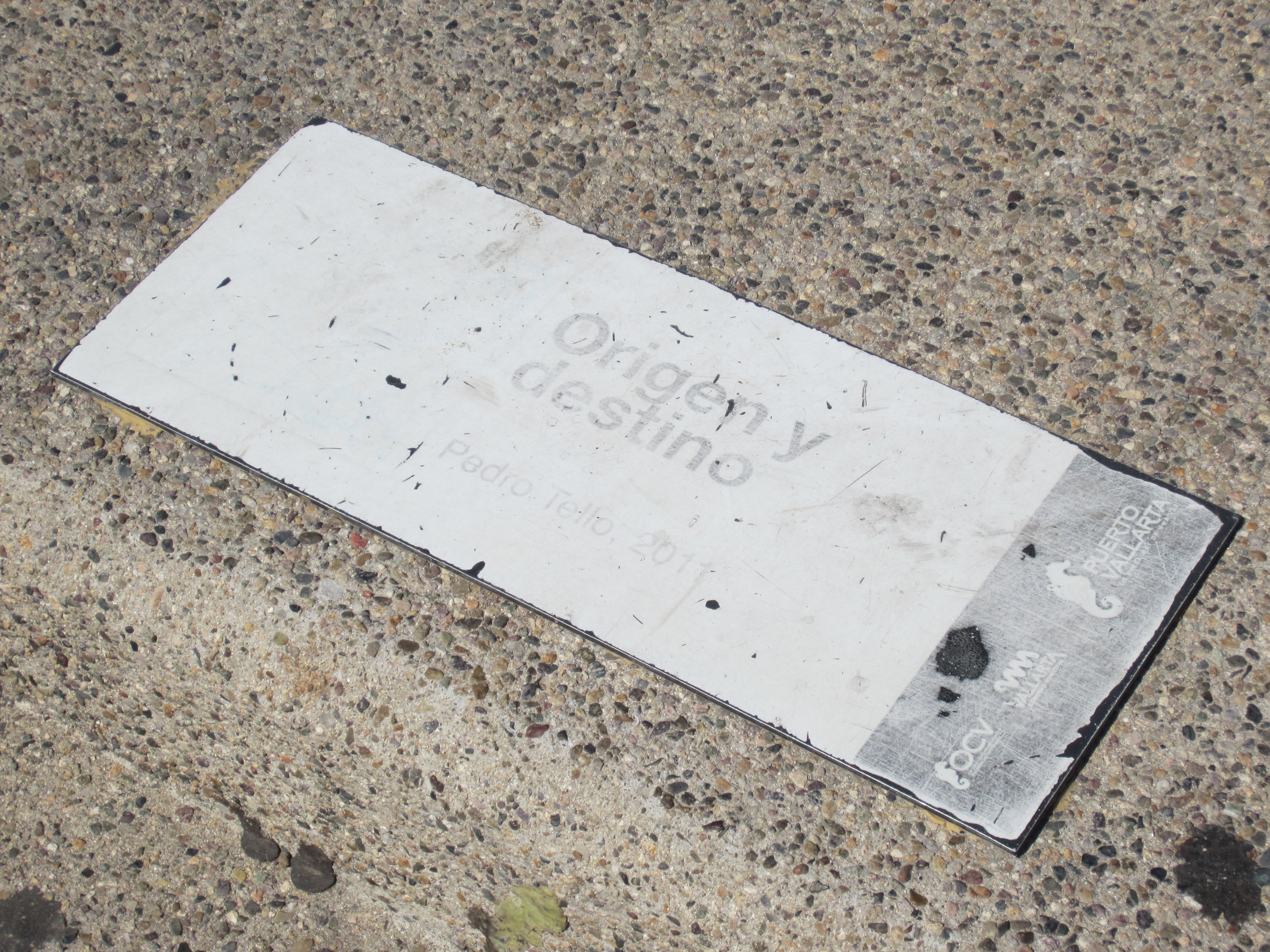
Plaque

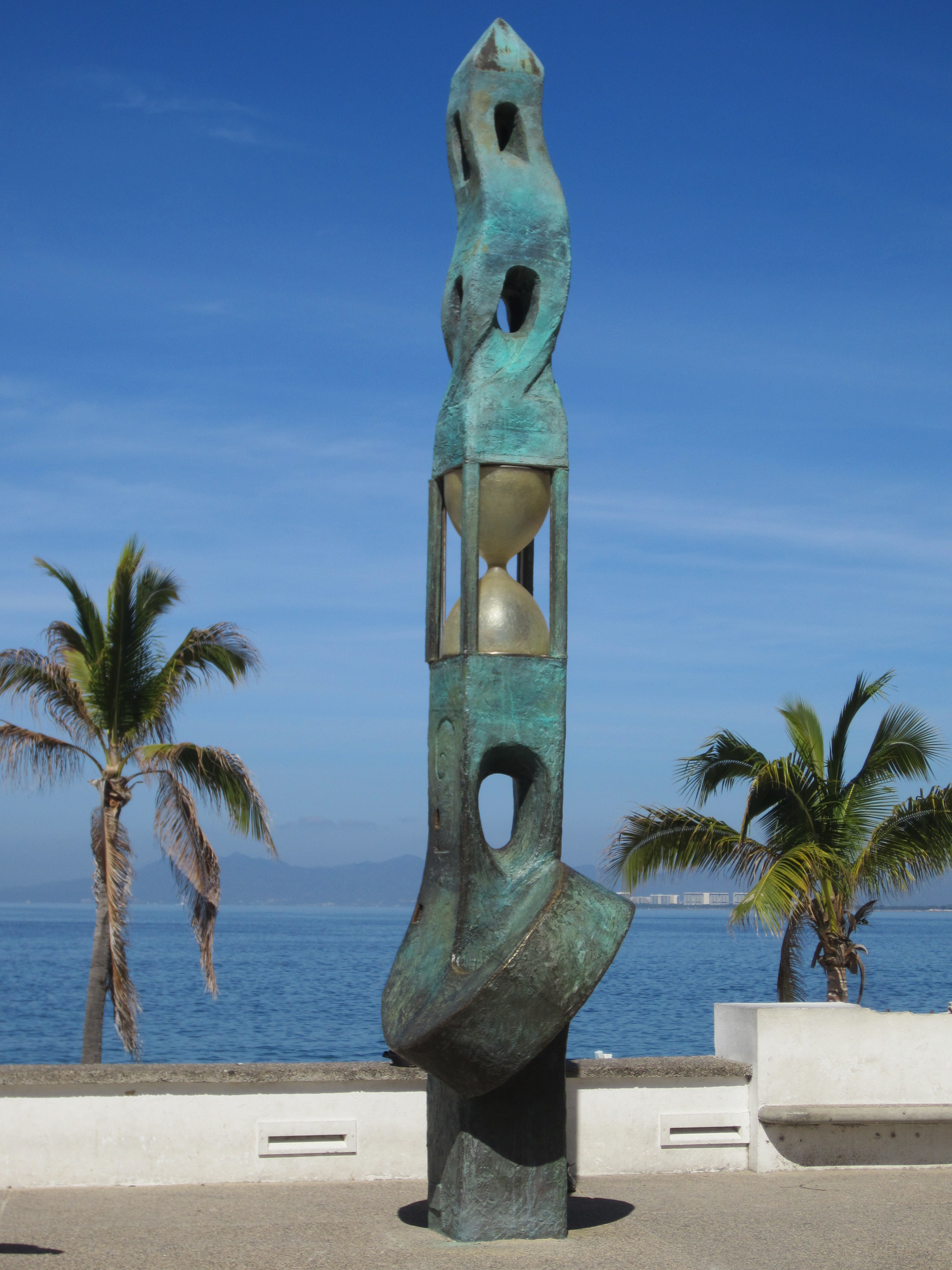

== See also ==
- 2011 in art
