= In Search of Reason =

2000 sculpture by Sergio Bustamante

- Spanish: En busca de la razón
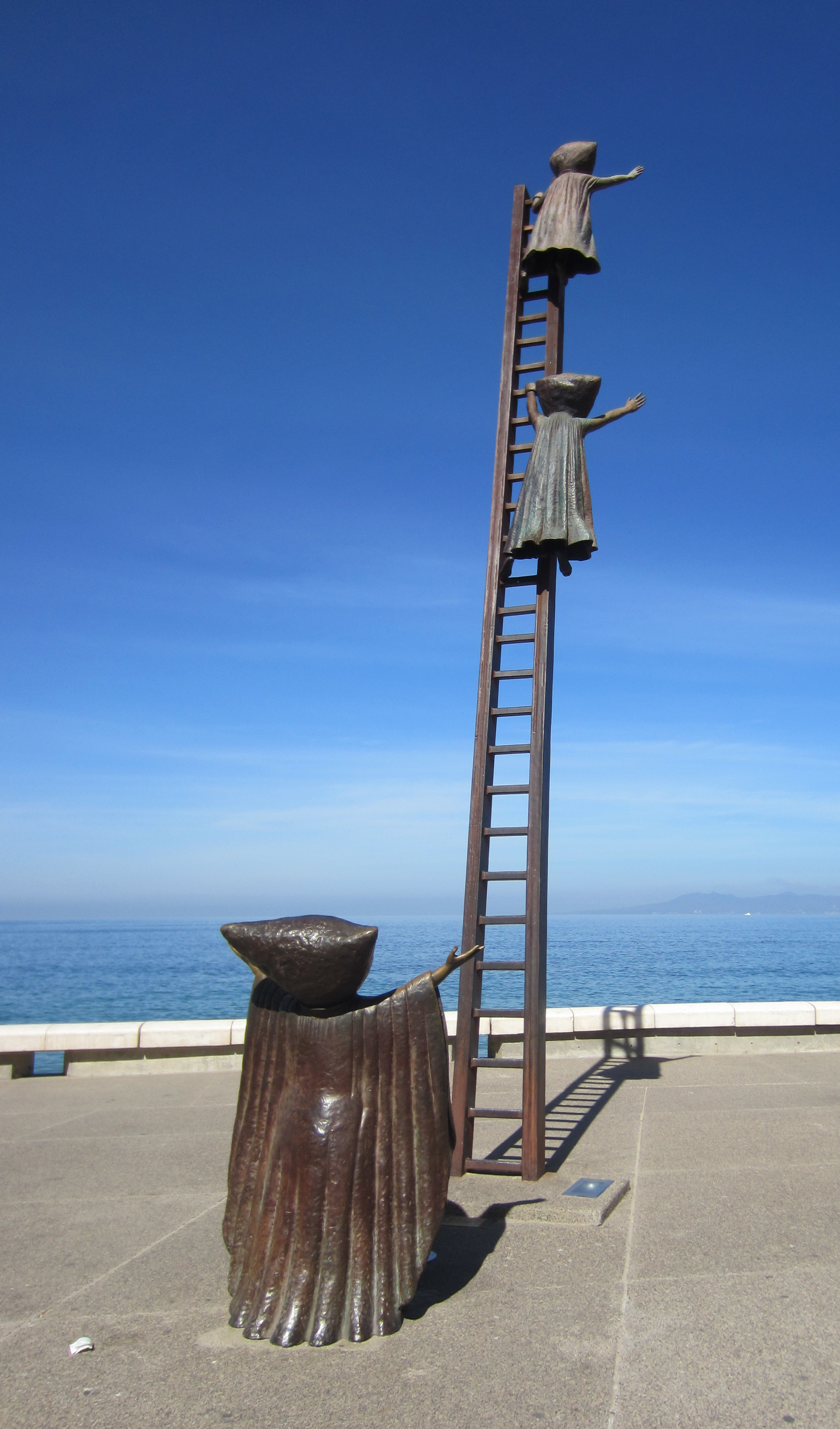
- The sculpture in 2014
- Artist: Sergio Bustamante
- Year: 2000
- Location: Puerto Vallarta, Jalisco, Mexico
- 20°36′39.4″N 105°14′5.6″W

In Search of Reason (Spanish: "En busca de la razón") is a 2000 sculpture by Sergio Bustamante, installed along Puerto Vallarta's Malecón, in the Mexican state of Jalisco.

== Description and history ==
Sergio Bustamante states that the sculpture was inspired by Nobel Peace Prize winner, philosopher and logician, Bertrand Russell and his writings: "When the intensity of emotional conviction subsides, a man who is in the habit of reasoning will search for logical grounds in favour of the belief which he finds in himself." Hence, the beseeching faces of the three figures and their quest to the heavens.

“I like getting people to interact with it, with my art.” So enjoy it, the artist wants you to. Sergio says about the piece: “It’s about freedom”.

The bronze sculpture is approximately 30 feet (9 meters) tall and was unveiled on the Malecon on July 4, 2000.

== See also ==
- 2000 in art
