= Las Orcas =

Sculpture in Puerto Vallarta, Jalisco, Mexico

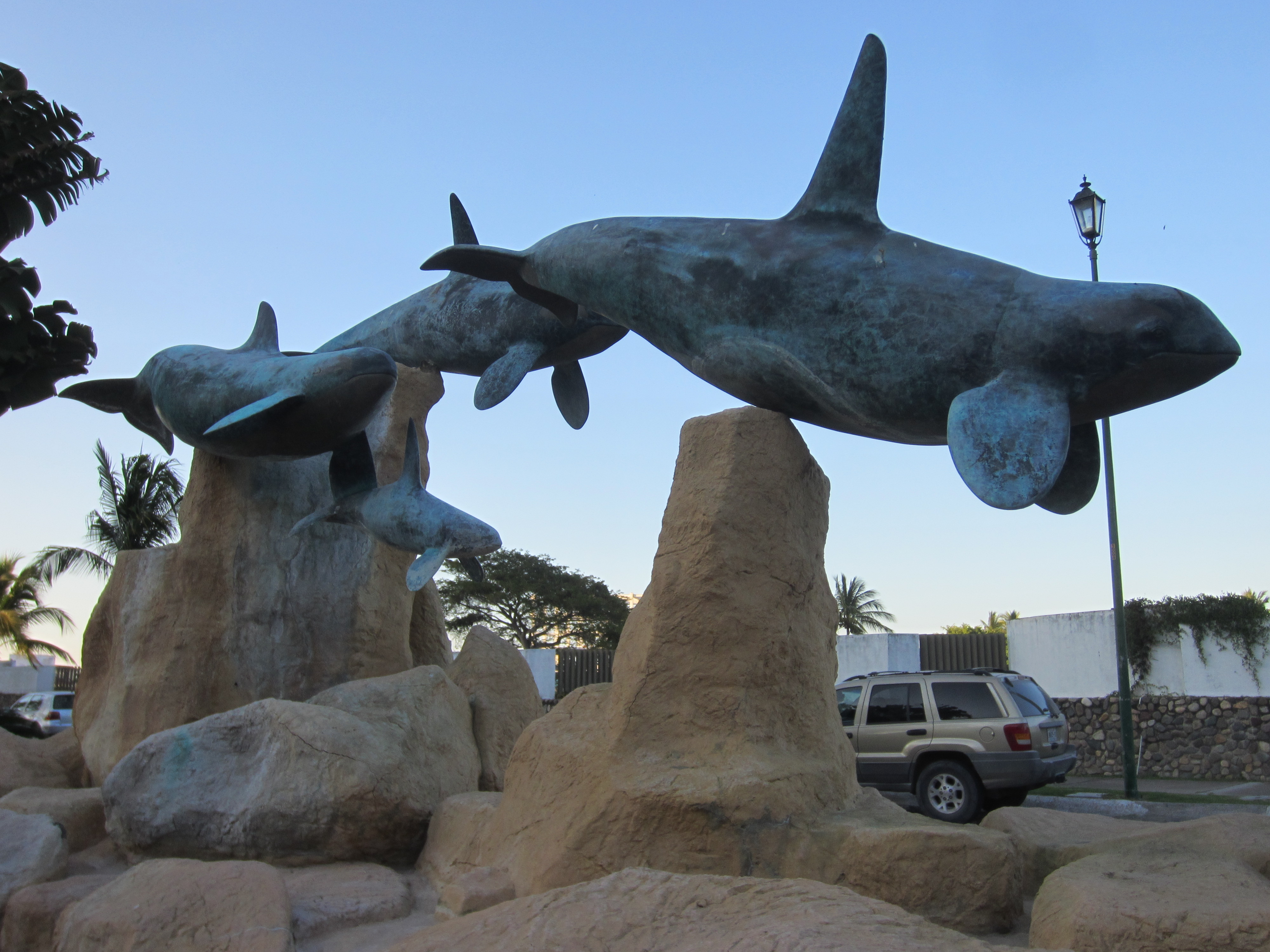
- Location: Puerto Vallarta, Jalisco, Mexico
- Coordinates: 20°39′56″N 105°15′33″W

Las Orcas is a sculpture by Octavio González, installed in Puerto Vallarta, in the Mexican state of Jalisco.
