= Statue of Paschal Baylón =

Statue in Puerto Vallarta, Mexico

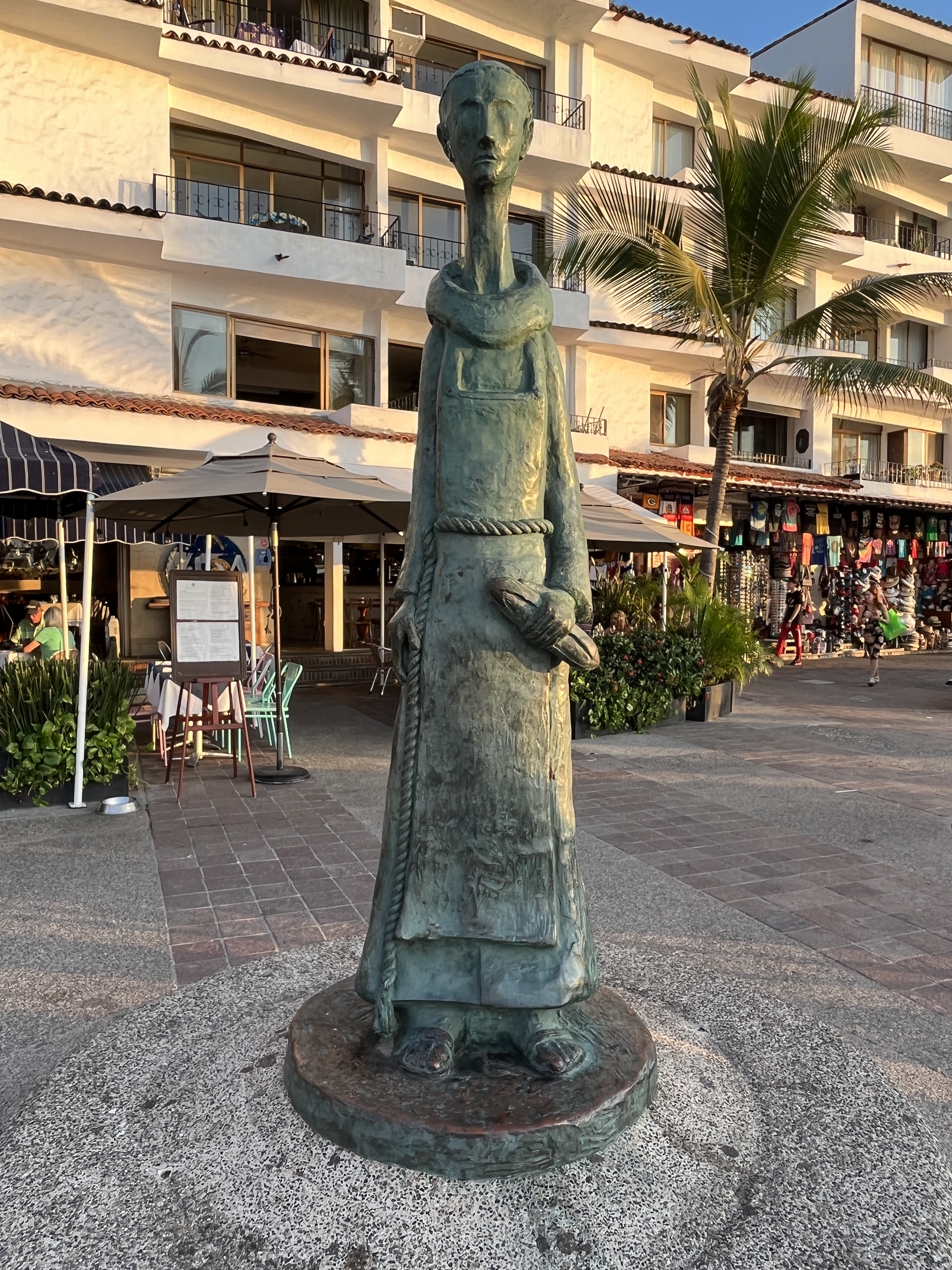
- The statue in 2022
- Location: Puerto Vallarta, Jalisco, Mexico; 20°36′28.2″N 105°14′13.2″W

A statue of Paschal Baylón (sometimes called San Pascual Bailón) is a sculpture by Ramiz Barquet, installed along Puerto Vallarta's Malecón, in the Mexican state of Jalisco.

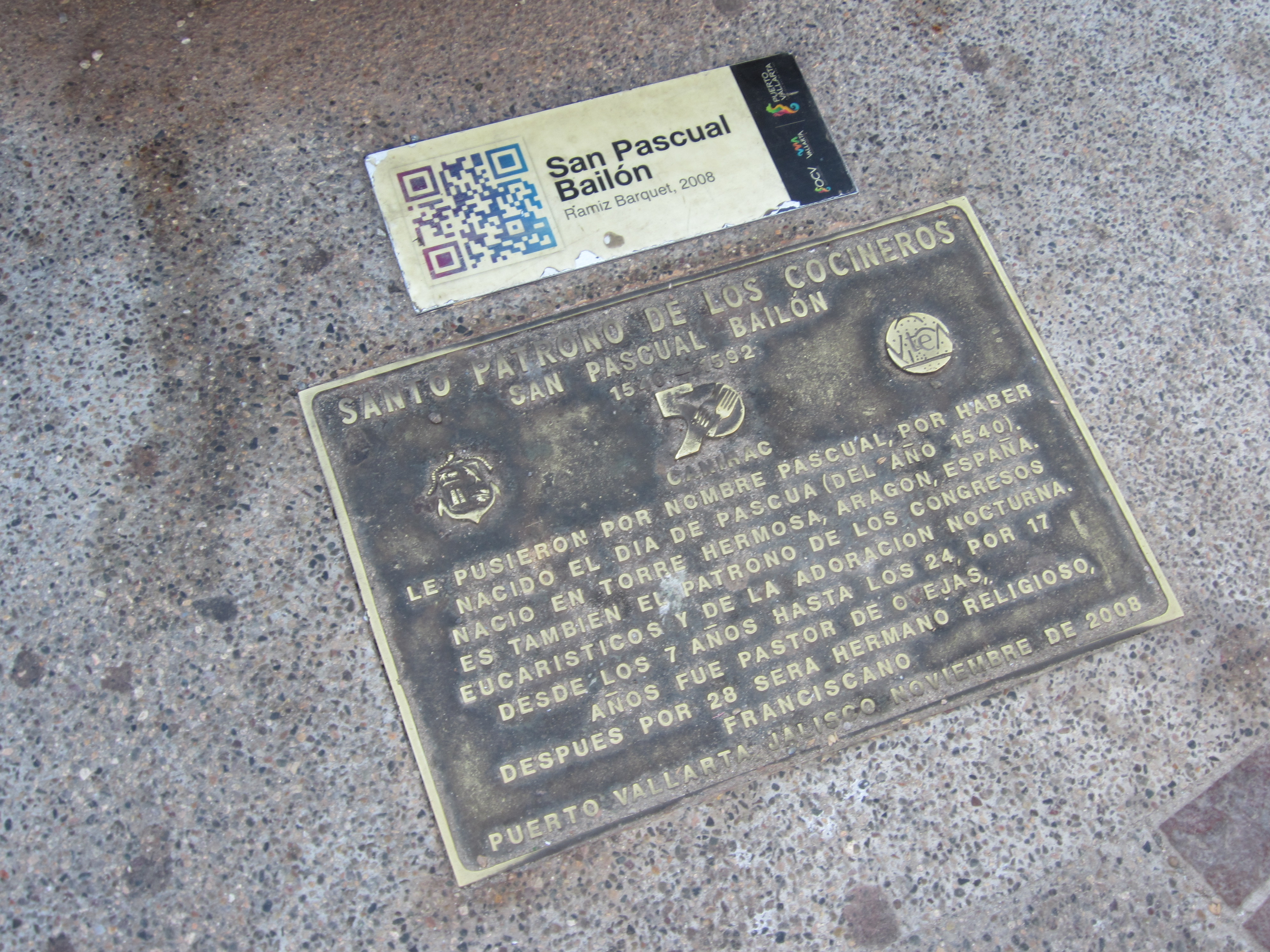
Plaque
