= The Good Fortune Unicorn =

Sculpture in Puerto Vallarta, Jalisco, Mexico

- Spanish: El Unicornio de la Buena Fortuna
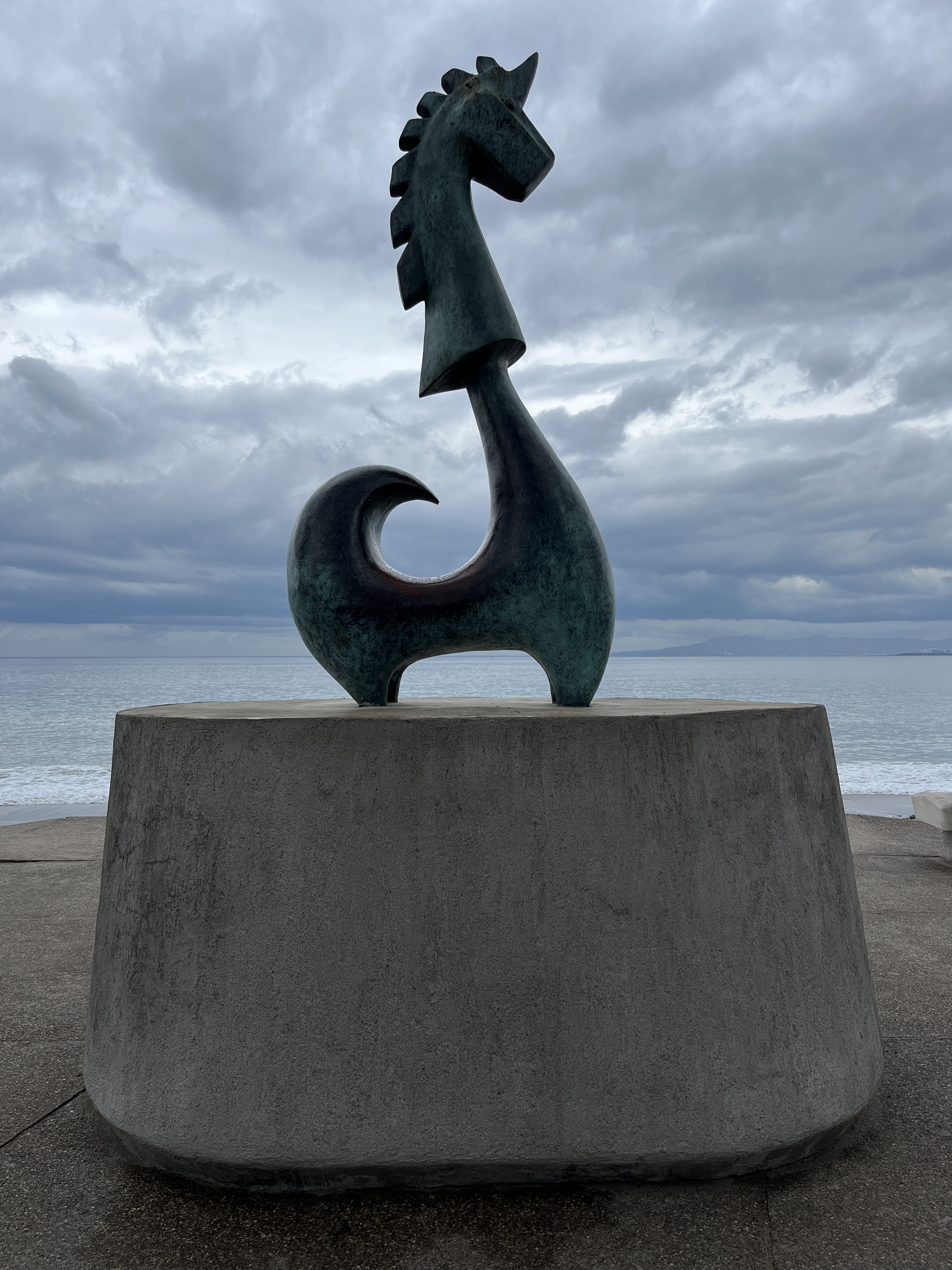
- The sculpture in 2024
- Artist: Anibal Riebeling
- Location: Puerto Vallarta, Jalisco, Mexico
- 20°36′44.7″N 105°14′2.7″W

The Good Fortune Unicorn (Spanish: "El Unicornio de la Buena Fortuna") is a sculpture by Anibal Riebeling, installed along Puerto Vallarta's Malecón, in the Mexican state of Jalisco. According to Fodor's, "Its sleek and curvy shape makes it look like a natural part of the malecón."
