= The Subtle Stone Eater =

2006 sculpture in Puerto Vallarta, Jalisco, Mexico

- El sutil comepiedras (Spanish)
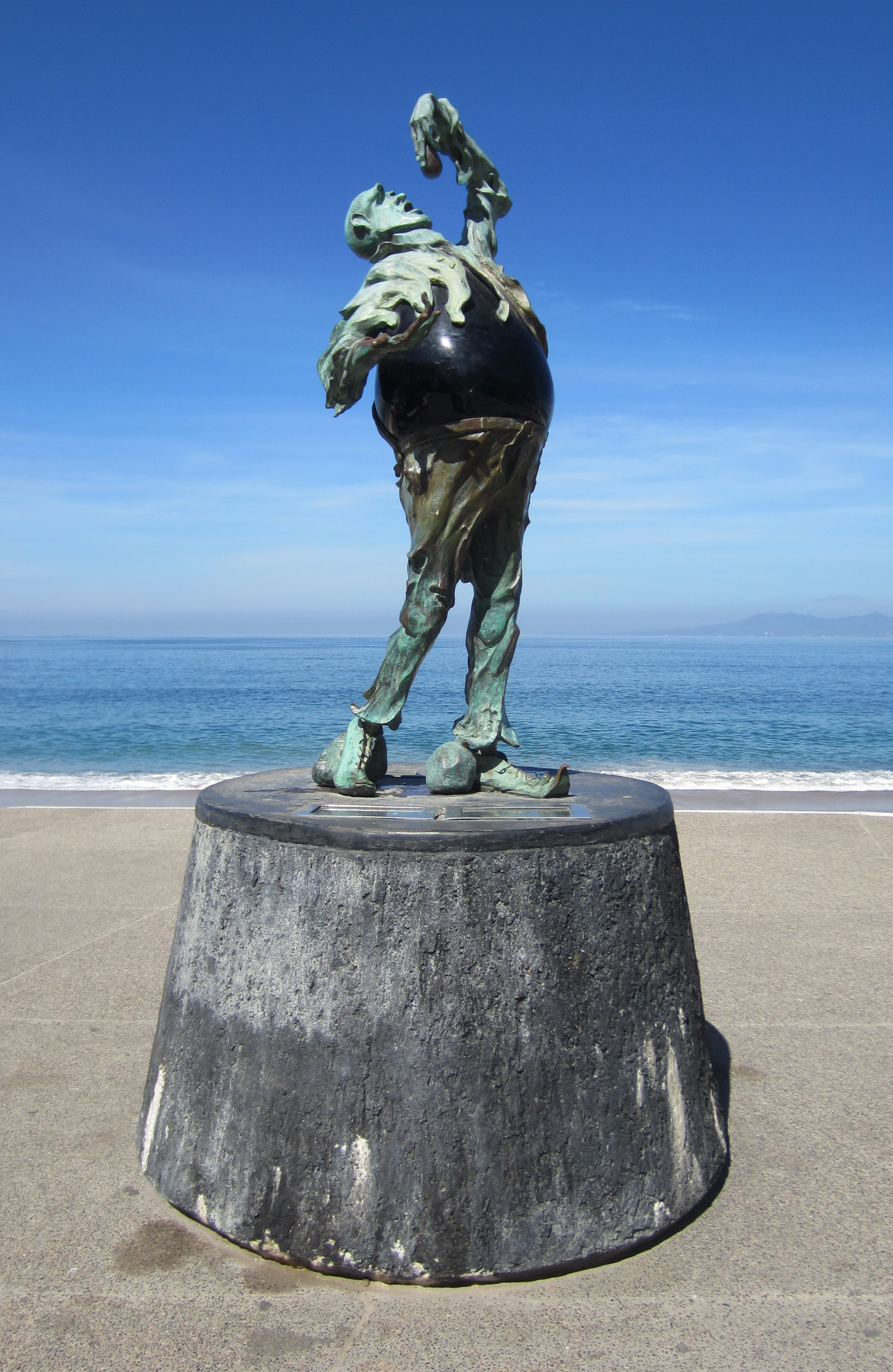
- The sculpture in 2014
- Artist: Jonás Gutiérrez
- Year: 2006
- Location: Puerto Vallarta, Jalisco, Mexico; 20°36′46.4″N 105°14′1.7″W

The Subtle Stone Eater (Spanish: "El sutil comepiedras") is a statue by Jonás Gutiérrez, installed along Puerto Vallarta's Malecón, in the Mexican state of Jalisco. The 2.4-metre (7.9 ft) bronze sculpture was installed in January 2006.

== See also ==
- 2006 in art
