= Vallarta Dancers =

Sculpture in Puerto Vallarta, Mexico

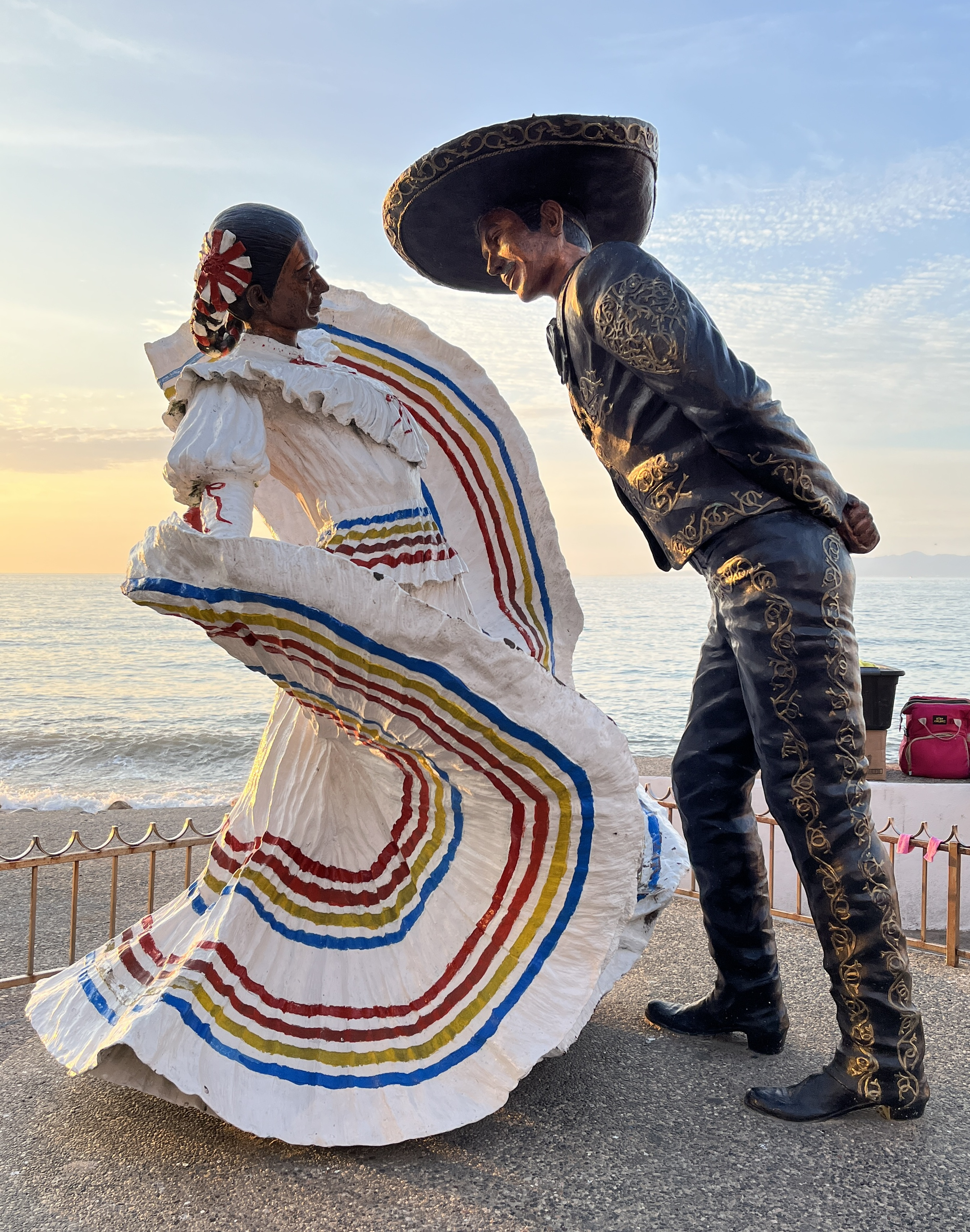
- The sculpture in 2022
- Artist: Jim Demetro
- Location: Puerto Vallarta, Jalisco, Mexico
- 20°36′30″N 105°14′12.4″W

Vallarta Dancers (Spanish: Bailarines de Vallarta) is a sculpture by Jim Demetro, installed along Puerto Vallarta's Malecón, in the Mexican state of Jalisco.
