= Friendship Fountain (Puerto Vallarta) =

1987 sculpture in Puerto Vallarta, Jalisco, Mexico

- La fuente de la amistad (Spanish)
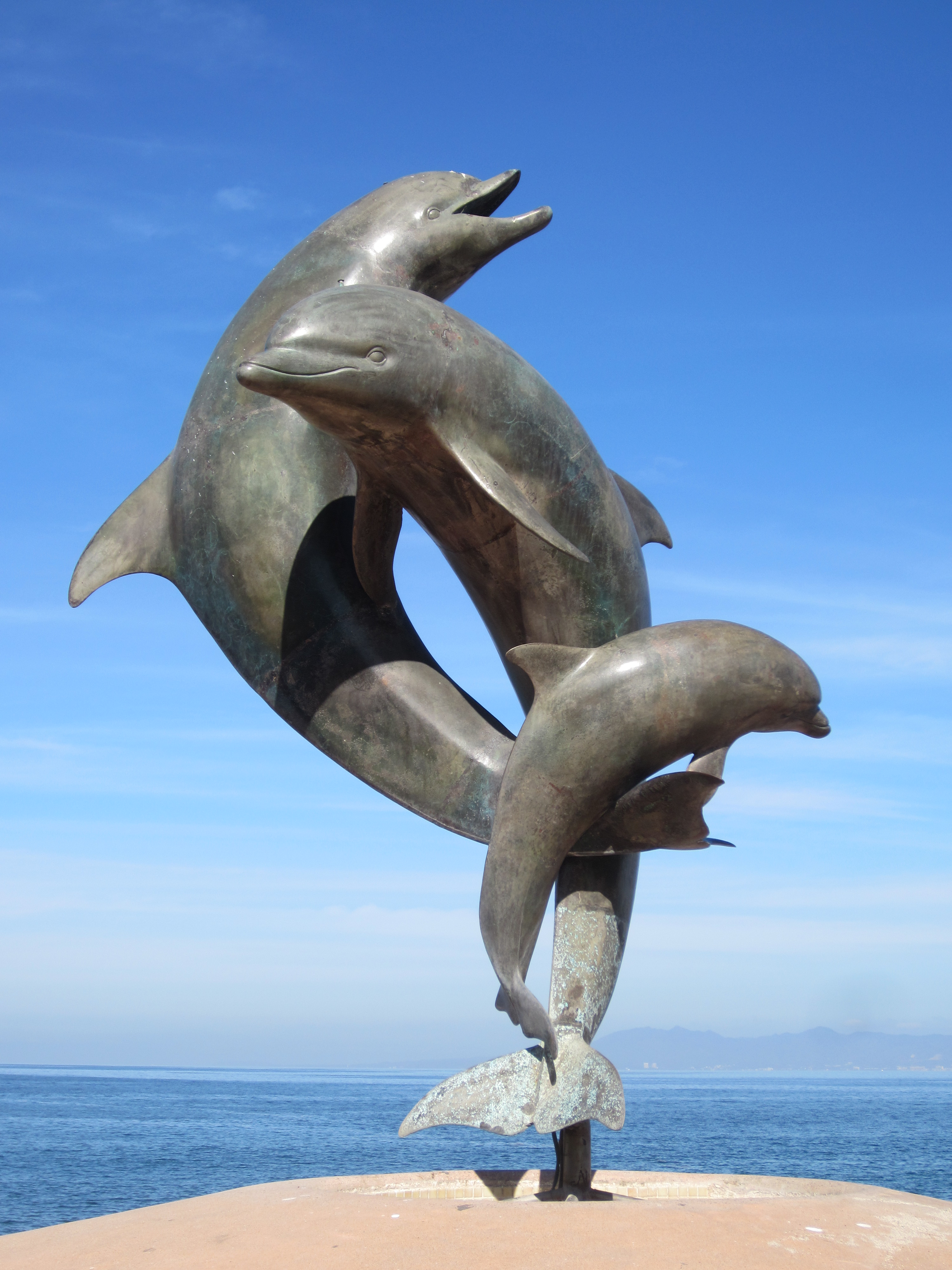
- The sculpture in 2014
- Year: 1987
- Location: Puerto Vallarta, Jalisco, Mexico; 20°36′31.7″N 105°14′11.3″W

The Friendship Fountain (Spanish: "La Fuente de la Amistad"), also known as Dancing Dolphins, is a 1987 sculpture depicting three dolphins by James "Bud" Bottoms and Octavio González, installed along Puerto Vallarta's Malecón, in the Mexican state of Jalisco.

== See also ==
- 1987 in art
