= Nostalgia (sculpture) =

1984 sculpture in Puerto Vallarta, Mexico

- Spanish: La nostalgia
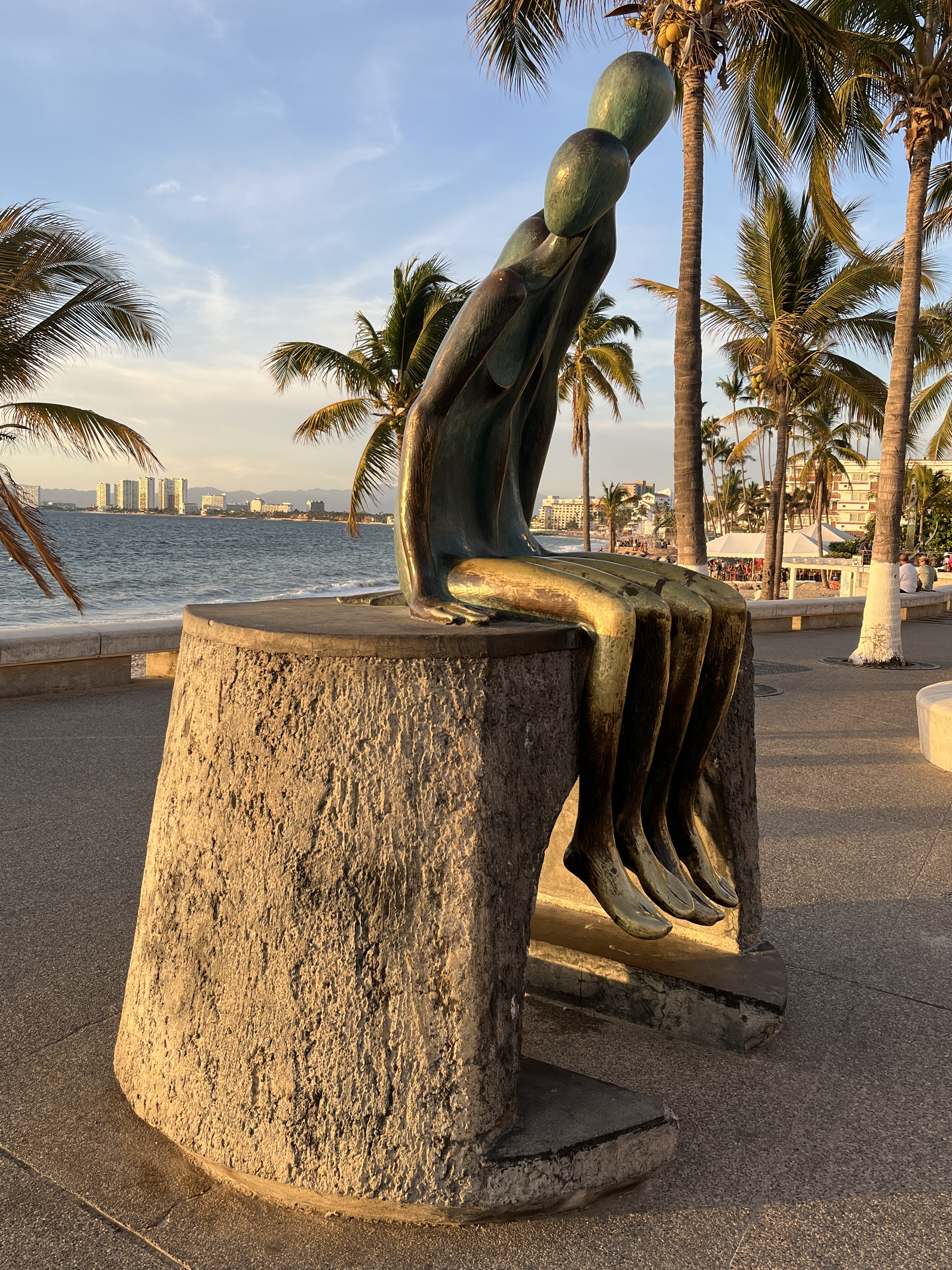
- The sculpture in 2023
- Artist: Ramiz Barquet
- Year: 1984
- Location: Puerto Vallarta, Jalisco, Mexico
- 20°36′48.2″N 105°14′0.7″W

Nostalgia (Spanish: "La nostalgia") is a 1984 sculpture by Ramiz Barquet, installed along Puerto Vallarta's Malecón, in the Mexican state of Jalisco.

== See also ==
- 1984 in art
