= Rain (sculpture) =

Sculpture in Puerto Vallarta, Jalisco, Mexico

- Spanish: Lluvia
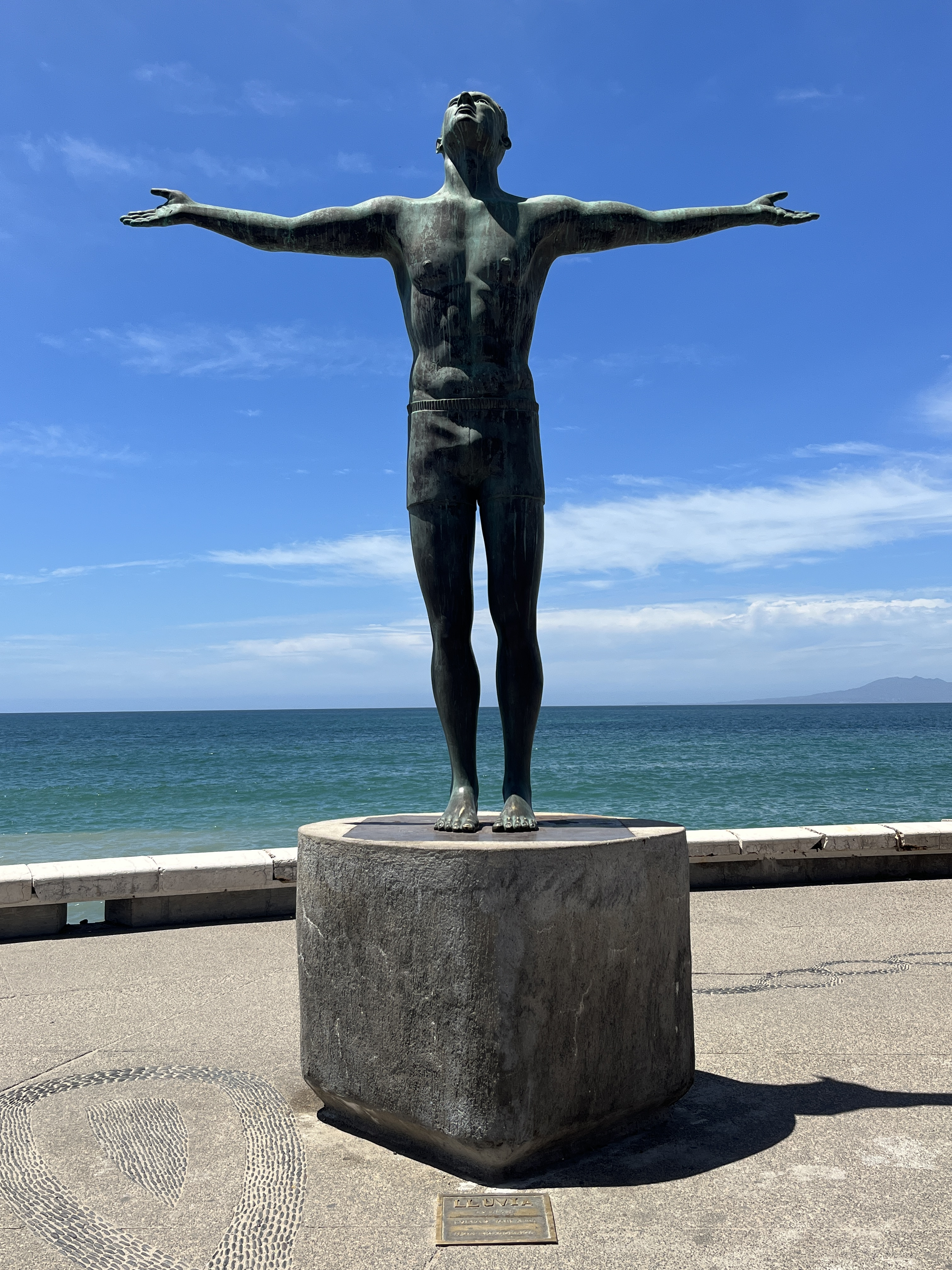
- The sculpture in 2023
- Location: Puerto Vallarta, Jalisco, Mexico
- 20°36′37.1″N 105°14′6.4″W

Rain (Spanish: "Lluvia") is a sculpture by Jovian, installed along Puerto Vallarta's Malecón, in the Mexican state of Jalisco. The 3.5-metre (11 ft), tall statue weighs 650 kilograms and depicts "a young man who, with open arms and gaze to the sky, welcomes both residents and visitors alike". The sculpture has been valued at US$60,000 and was donated by the artist via Galería Corsica.
