= Statue of Lorena Ochoa =

Statue in Puerto Vallarta, Mexico

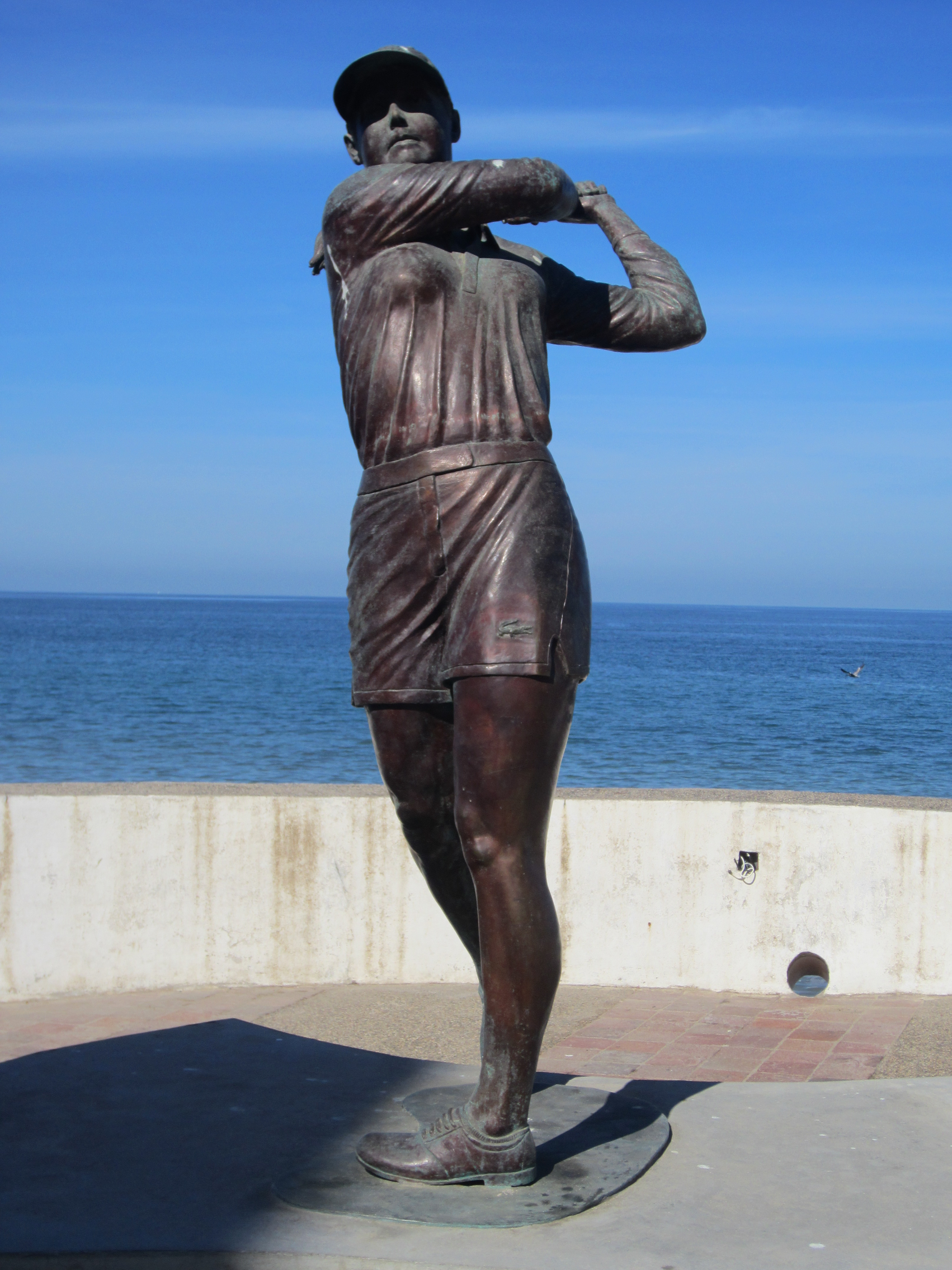
- The sculpture in 2014
- Year: 2012
- Subject: Lorena Ochoa
- Location: Puerto Vallarta, Jalisco, Mexico; 20°36′27.43″N 105°14′14.25″W

A statue of former Mexican professional golfer Lorena Ochoa was installed in Puerto Vallarta, in 2012.

In 2015, the bronze sculpture was removed from Centro for restoration, and later reported as missing or stolen. As of 2020, the statue is located at the entrance of Marina Vallarta Golf Club.

== See also ==
- 2012 in art
