= Rafael Zamarripa =

Mexican painter, designer and dancer (born 1942)

- Born: February 8, 1942 (age 83); Guadalajara, Mexico
- Known for: Painter; sculpture; designer; dancer; choreography

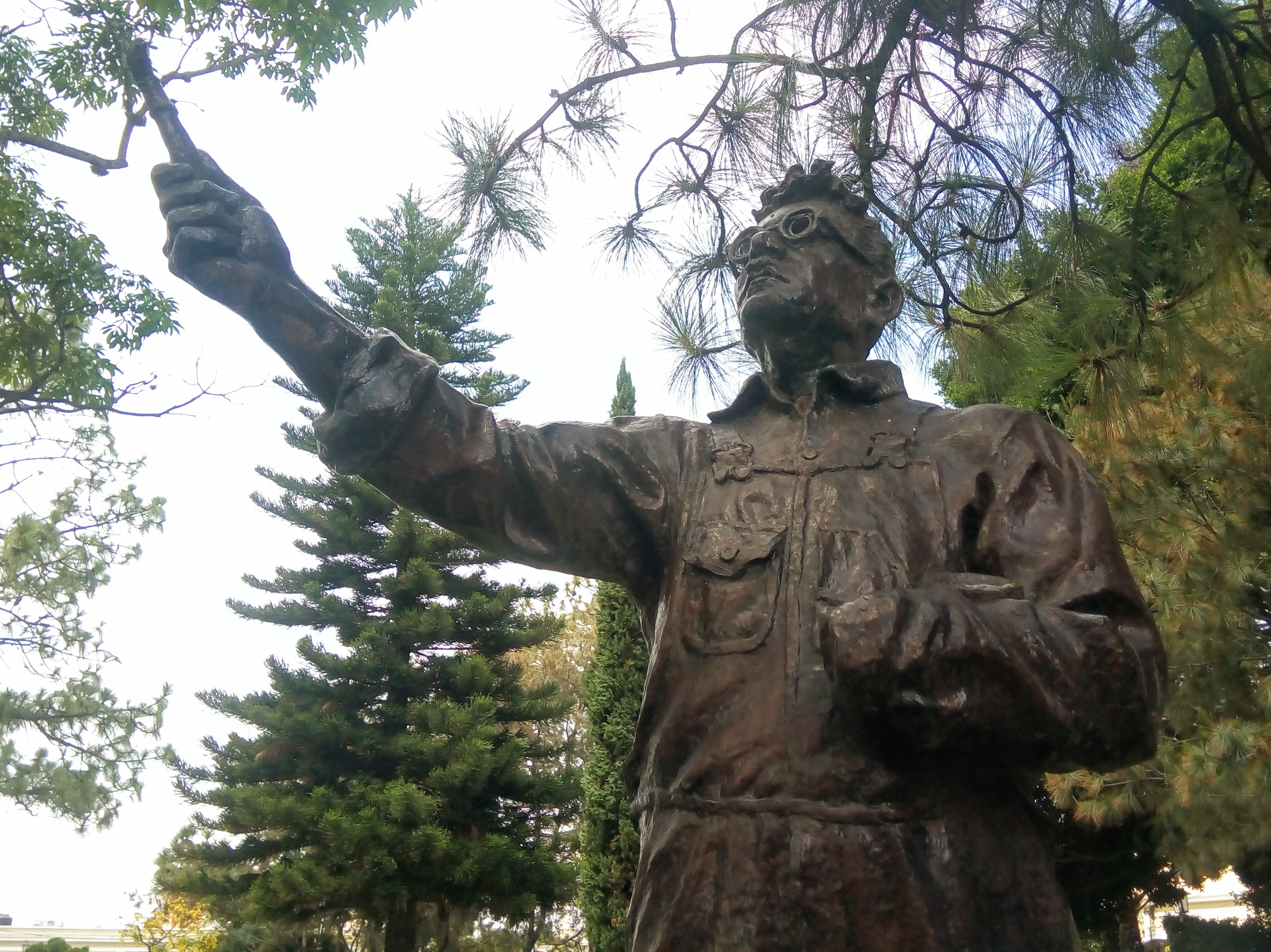
José Clemente Orozco's monument, an artwork by Zamarripa.

Rafael Zamarripa Castañeda (born February 8, 1942) is a Mexican painter, sculptor, designer, dancer and choreographer.

== Early life and education ==
Zamarripa was born in 1942 in Guadalajara, Jalisco, Mexico, to Francisco ‘Don Panchito’ Zamarripa, a shoemaker, and Maria de Luz Castañeda, who loved to play the piano.

Zamarripa discovered his interest and talent in art at an early age. As a child, he was amazed by puppets and eventually started making his own. He used sticks, paper, and cardboard to make the puppets and dressed them with fabric. At the age of eight his parents sent him to work with a santero (sculptor of religious wooden figures), where he started practicing his sculpting skills.

He enrolled in the school at the age of fourteen. The school's music department offered a Mexican folk dance class in the summer, composed primarily of female students who were in need of male dance partners. Zamarripa, along with other students from the art department, joined and he began dancing there with no formal training. When summer classes ended, the dance students wanted to continue dancing on their own, so they formed a local student group that met every Saturday. They practiced regional folk dances, traditional Jarabes, and zones, taught to them by María del Refugio García Brambila and Francisco Sanchez Flores.

After completing a degree in art and education in Mexico, Zamarripa took advanced art courses in Italy, New Zealand, and Australia.

== Career ==
At the age of 18, Zamarripa was hired to sculpt The Boy on the Seahorse, which has become one of the official symbols of the city of Puerto Vallarta.

In 1962, Zamarripa was approached by Amalia Hernández, (who developed folkloric dance for theater, and founded Ballet Folklórico de México).

Soon after, he joined the Ballet on a trip to Europe, where they placed first at the Festival of Nations in Paris. Upon returning, he started to formalize the dance group, employing the new techniques he learned with Hernández.

When his group returned to Guadalajara, the director realized Zamarripa's potential as a producer and a director, equating his staging abilities with those of Amalia Hernández. A few years later, Zamarripa formed El Grupo Folklórico de Guadalajara, which would define and set the standard for traditional folkloric dance.

In 1966 Zamarripa also established the Escuela de Danza at the University of Guadalajara, becoming its first director.

In 1980, he created the Centro de Danza Universitaria at the University of Colima, one of the first universities to offer a bachelor's degree in Mexican folkloric dance.

In 2000, Zamarripa completed a series of sketches to be featured in the book Trajes de Danza Mexicana, a collaboration with Xochitl Medina Ortiz. The book, published in 2001, contains detailed illustrations and descriptions of the folk dance attire of each of the 32 Mexican states.

In 2010, Olga Nájera-Ramirez wrote, directed, and produced a 50-minute documentary the focused on Mexican folklórico dance through the life and accomplishments of Zamarripa. The film, Danza Folklórica Escénica, showcased Zamarripa's choreography and artwork.

Today, his paintings and sculptures adorn buildings and parks in Jalisco and Colima, such as the bronze relief structure on the Teatro Degollado and the León en el Árbol sculpture in Guadalajara's Plaza Tapatia. He has been a maestro and choreographer for different folk dance groups in Mexico and the United States, and has showcased his choreography around the world. He is currently the director of the Ballet Folklórico de la Universidad de Colima and Chair of the Department of Dance in the Instituto Universitario de Bellas Artes at the University of Colima.

== Work ==
Zamarripa has founded several major dance companies including the award-winning Grupo Folklórico de la Universidad de Guadalajara and Ballet Folklórico de la Universidad de Colima. His contributions to the Mexican folk dance genre include the presentation of corridos (narrative ballads) on stage, the raza technique (a teaching method that uses drums to perfect dancers' footwork), and the creation of the culebra dance prototype (the Snake Dance).

He has directed many types of dance, including regional dances from Mexico, Pre-Hispanic dances, ritual dances, indigenous dances, and corridos. Zamarripa strives to retain the cultural and historical roots of the dances he choreographs. He has attended workshops, conferences, and universities in Mexico and the United States to assist folkloric dance groups and offer his expertise.

== Awards and notability ==
- The National Sculptor Prize (1960)
- First Place in Festival of Nations (Paris, 1961)
- Received honors (medal, parchment, $50,000) from the Fundación Pedro Sarquís Merrewe in Guadalajara for work in visual arts and dance (2007)
