= The Washer Woman =

Sculpture by Jim Demetro

- Spanish: La Lavandera
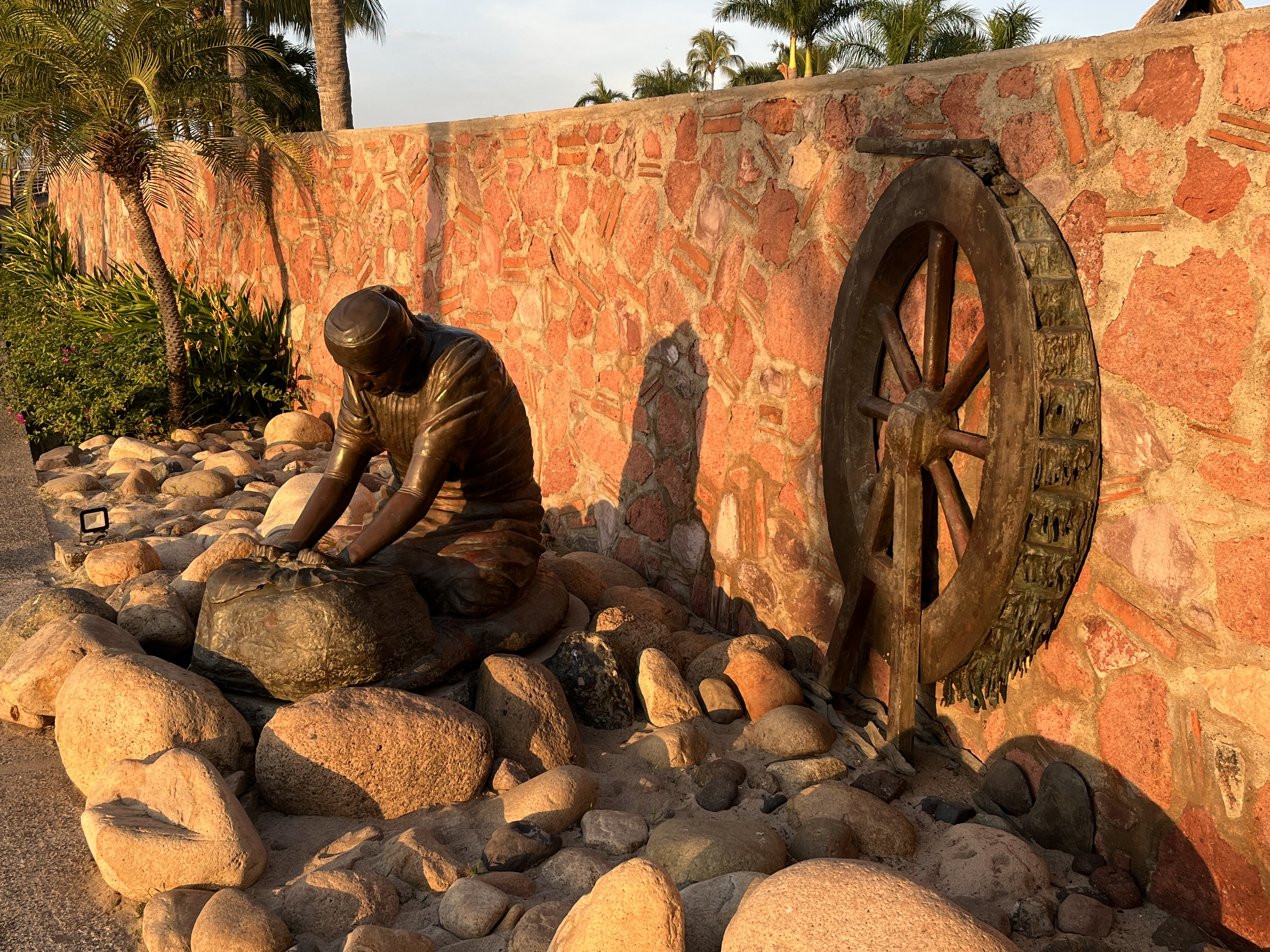
- The sculpture in 2022
- Artist: Jim Demetro
- Location: Puerto Vallarta, Jalisco, Mexico
- 20°36′17.6″N 105°14′17.8″W

The Washer Woman (Spanish: "La Lavandera") is a sculpture by Jim Demetro, installed on a wall of Puerto Vallarta's Molino de Agua Condominium, in the Mexican state of Jalisco.

== Description and history ==
The statue depicts a woman washing clothes on a rock, next to a water mill. The subject of laundresses, also known as washerwomen, used to be a popular one in art. Malorie Mackey of Viva Glam Magazine said the sculpture demonstrates how Demetro "showcases the dying traditions of Puerto Vallarta".

Demetro had a smaller version of the sculpture in his possession, as of 2009.
