= Sergio Bustamante (artist) =

Mexican artist (born 1949)

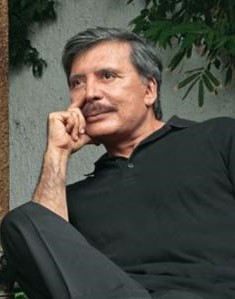
- Born: 1949 (age 76–77); Culiacan, Sinaloa
- Education: University of Guadalajara
- Known for: Artist
- Movement: Family Workshop Studio
- Website: Official website

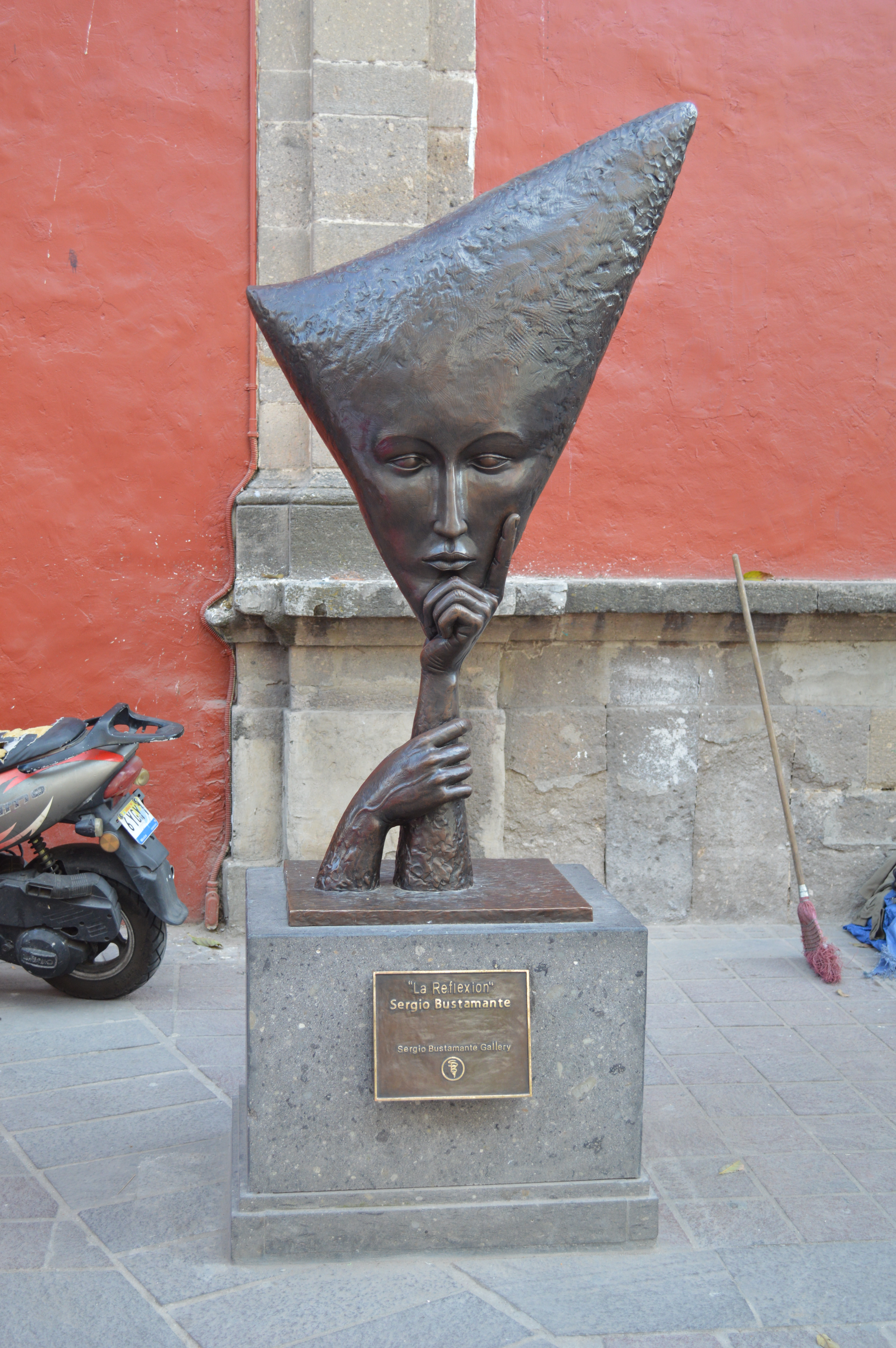
La Reflexion, in Tlaquepaque

Sergio Bustamante is a Mexican artist and sculptor. He was born in Culiacan, Sinaloa, in 1949, and studied architecture at the University of Guadalajara.

Bustamante's first art exhibition showcased paintings and papier-mâché figures at the Galeria Misracha in Mexico City in 1966. In 1975, Bustamante was part of a group of artists that established the "Family Workshop Studio" in Tlaquepaque, Jalisco. In the mid-1970s, his practice expanded to include wood and bronze sculpture.

== Works ==
- In Search of Reason (2000)
