= Jim Demetro =

American sculptor

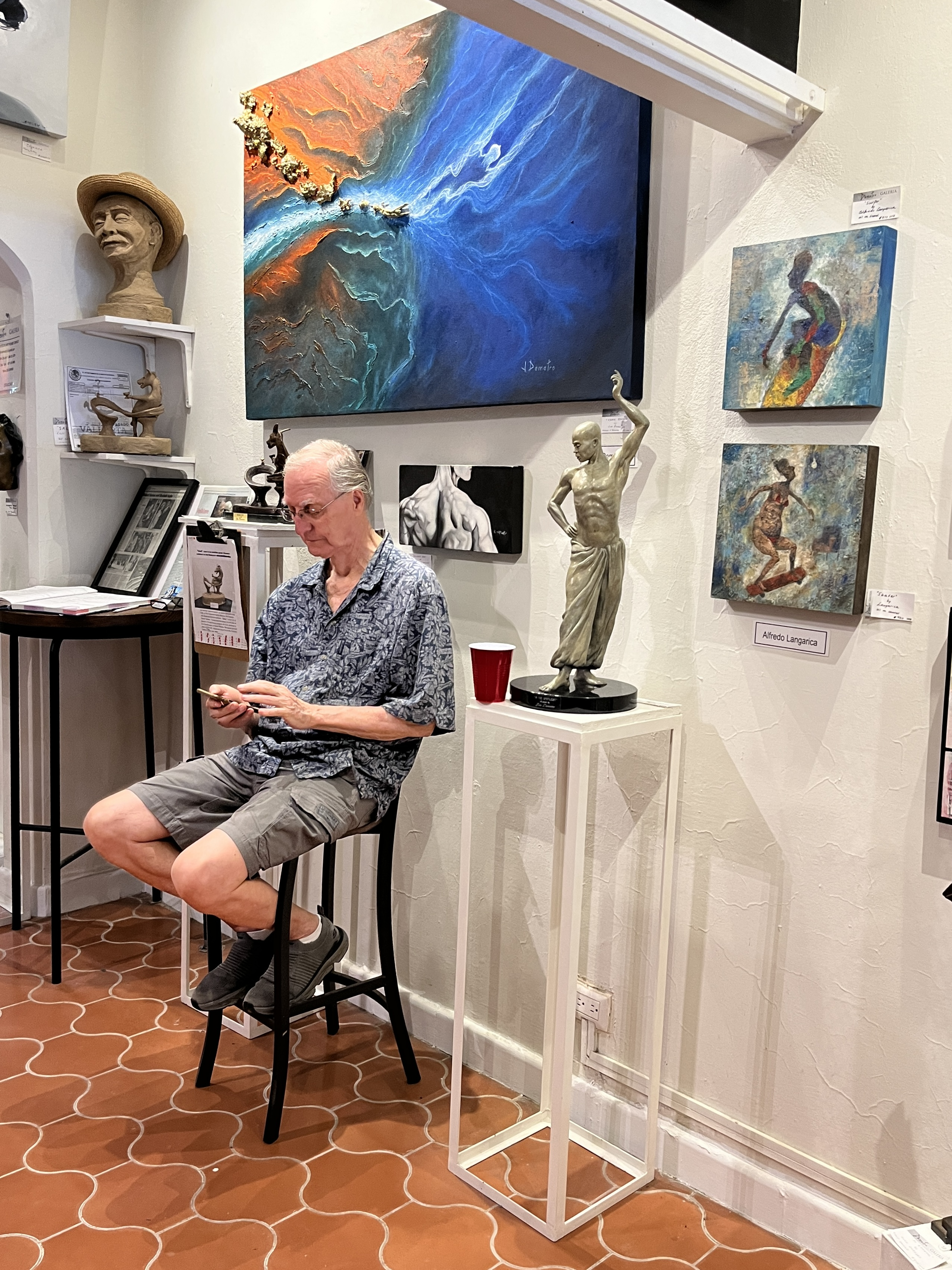
- Demetro at Demetro Galeria, Puerto Vallarta, 2023
- Education: Milwaukee School of Engineering

Jim Demetro is an American sculptor. Forty-seven of his public artworks were displayed internationally, as of 2009.

== Early life and education ==
Demetro was raised in South Chicago. Both of his parents died before he was twenty years old. He graduated from the Milwaukee School of Engineering.

== Career ==
Demetro is a sculptor. He has a studio in Battle Ground, Washington.

== Personal life ==
Demetro spends time in Battle Ground; in 2017, he received the 2016 Lifetime Achievement Award from the Clark County Arts Commission at a Clark County Council meeting.

Demetro is married; the couple have twin daughters, including sculptor and collaborator Christina.

== Works ==
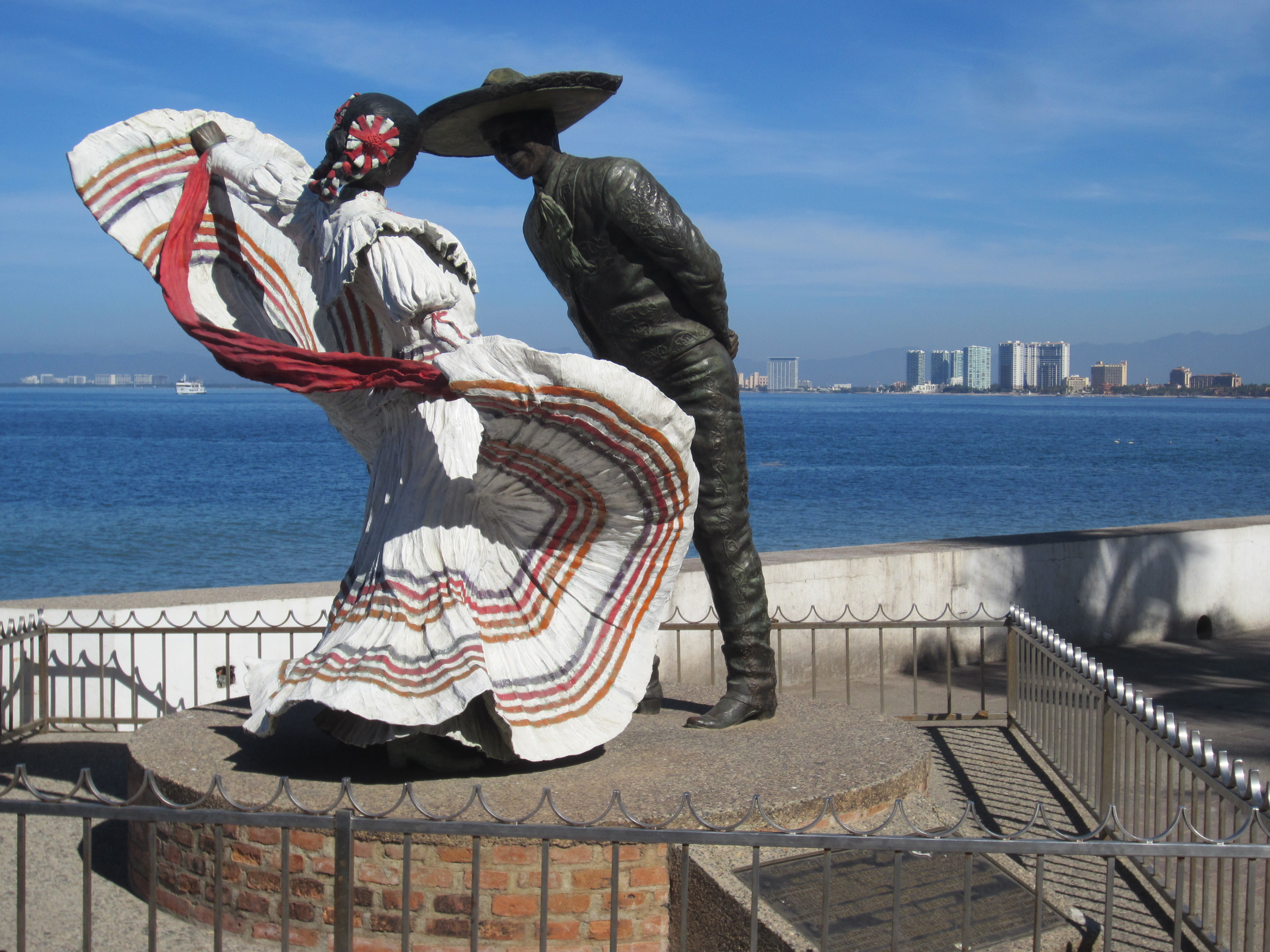
Vallarta Dancers, Puerto Vallarta

- Ándale Bernardo, Puerto Vallarta
- Elizabeth Taylor and Richard Burton (with Christina Demetro), Puerto Vallarta
- The Fishermen, Puerto Vallarta
- First Footsteps
- Mother's Touch
- Salud
- Shower of Love
- Spiraling Salmon, part of the Salmon Run Bell Tower, Vancouver, Washington
- Statue of George Vancouver, Vancouver, Washington
- Vallarta Dancers, Puerto Vallarta
- The Washer Woman, Puerto Vallarta
- Woman Bathing Child
