= Manuel Lepe Macedo =

Mexican painter

- Born: April 17, 1936; Puerto Vallarta, Mexico
- Died: September 9, 1984 (aged 48); Guadalajara, Mexico
- Known for: Painting
- Style: Naïve

Manuel Lepe Macedo (April 17, 1936 in Puerto Vallarta, Jalisco – September 9, 1984 in Guadalajara, Jalisco) was a Mexican artist who painted in a Naïve style. He painted mostly themes based on the landscape and townscape of his native Puerto Vallarta.

Lepe was never formally trained as an artist, and attended only four years of primary school. His paintings came to symbolize the town during the years that it was becoming popular as a resort.

Lepe became internationally known, with exhibitions of his work in several US museums and galleries.

He died in 1984 in Guadalajara from a cerebral aneurysm. His workshop in Puerto Vallarta was preserved as a gallery and museum (now closed). Some of his works were on display at the Peter Gray Museum of Art (now closed) on the Coastal Campus of the University of Guadalajara, north of Puerto Vallarta. ARTe Vallarta Museo, Colonial El Remance, Puerto Vallarta, near the Romantic Zone, exhibits the largest known collection of original Manuel Lepe paintings in the world. The artwords are primarily from the collection of Frank and Gail Rudin.

April 17 is celebrated in Puerto Vallarta as Manuel Lepe day.
