= Plaza de Armas (Puerto Vallarta) =

Plaza in Puerto Vallarta, Jalisco, Mexico

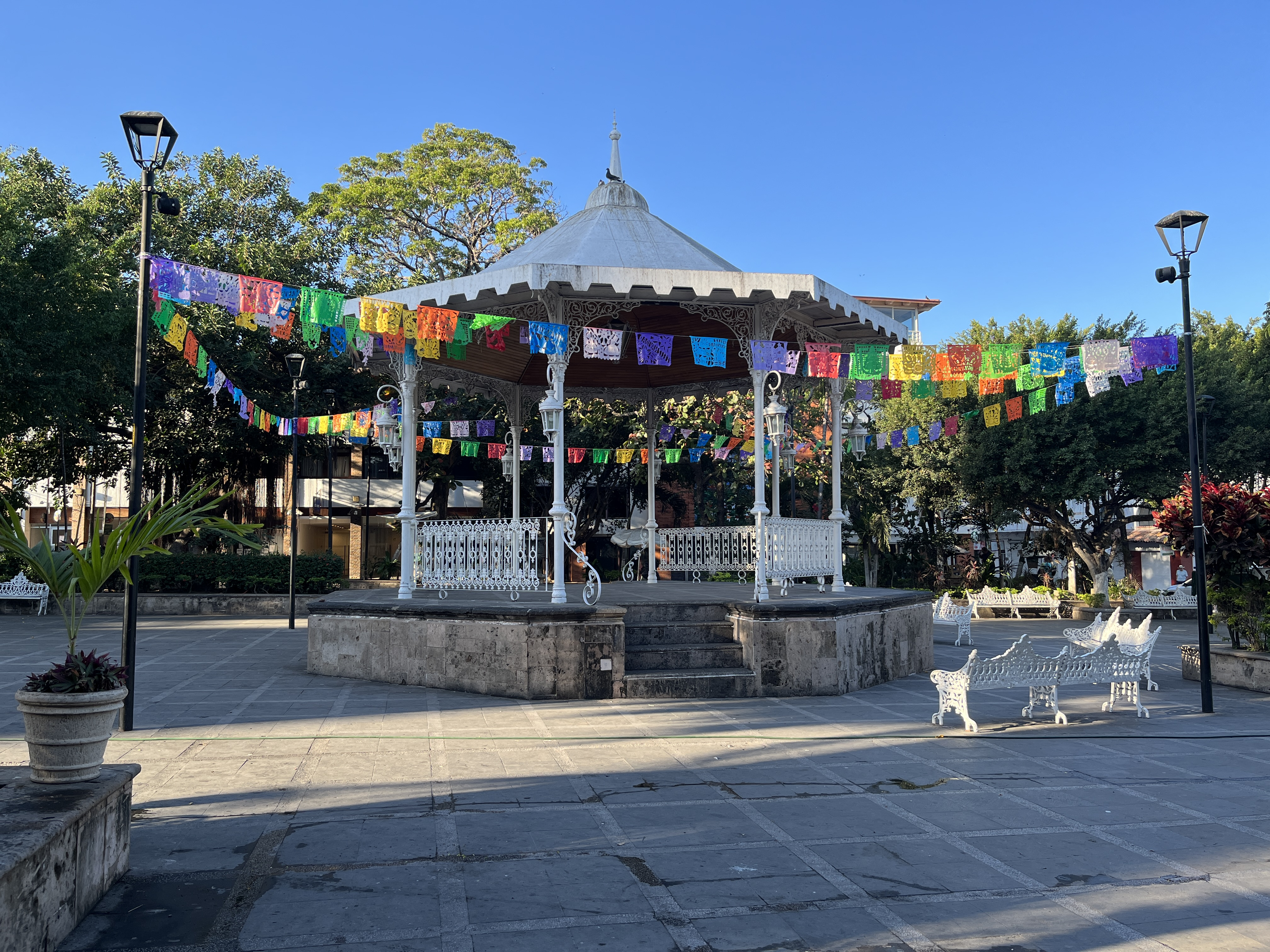
- The plaza's bandstand in 2023

- Location within Mexico
- Location: Puerto Vallarta, Mexico
- Coordinates: 20°36′30.5″N 105°14′8″W

Plaza de Armas (English: "Main Square") is a plaza and local attraction in Centro, Puerto Vallarta, in the Mexican state of Jalisco.

== Description ==
Located in Old Town, along the Malecón and adjacent to Presidencia Municipal, or city hall. The square is known for displaying art. Nearby attractions include Church of Our Lady of Guadalupe and Los Arcos amphitheatre.

The square features a bronze statue of Ignacio Vallarta, the Jalisco attorney and namesake of the city, by Miguel Carmona.
