= Centro, Puerto Vallarta =

Historic center of Puerto Vallarta, Jalisco, Mexico

- Historic Center
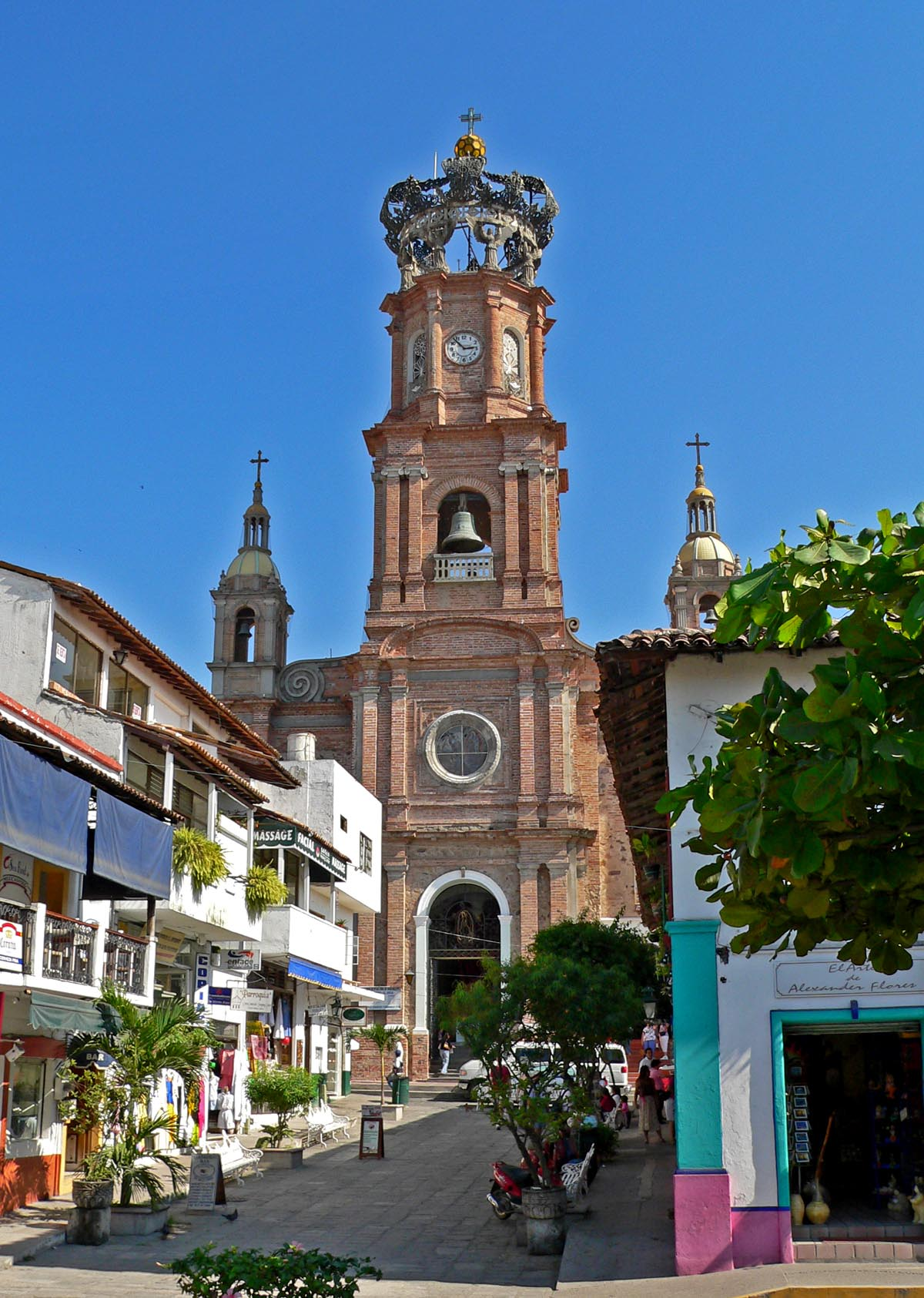
- Church of Our Lady of Guadalupe
- Country: Mexico
- State: Jalisco
- City: Puerto Vallarta

Population
  - Total: 1,840

Centro, or Downtown, is the historic center of Puerto Vallarta, in the Mexican state of Jalisco.

The district is north of Zona Romántica and the Cuale River, and south of 5 de Diciembre.

== Features ==
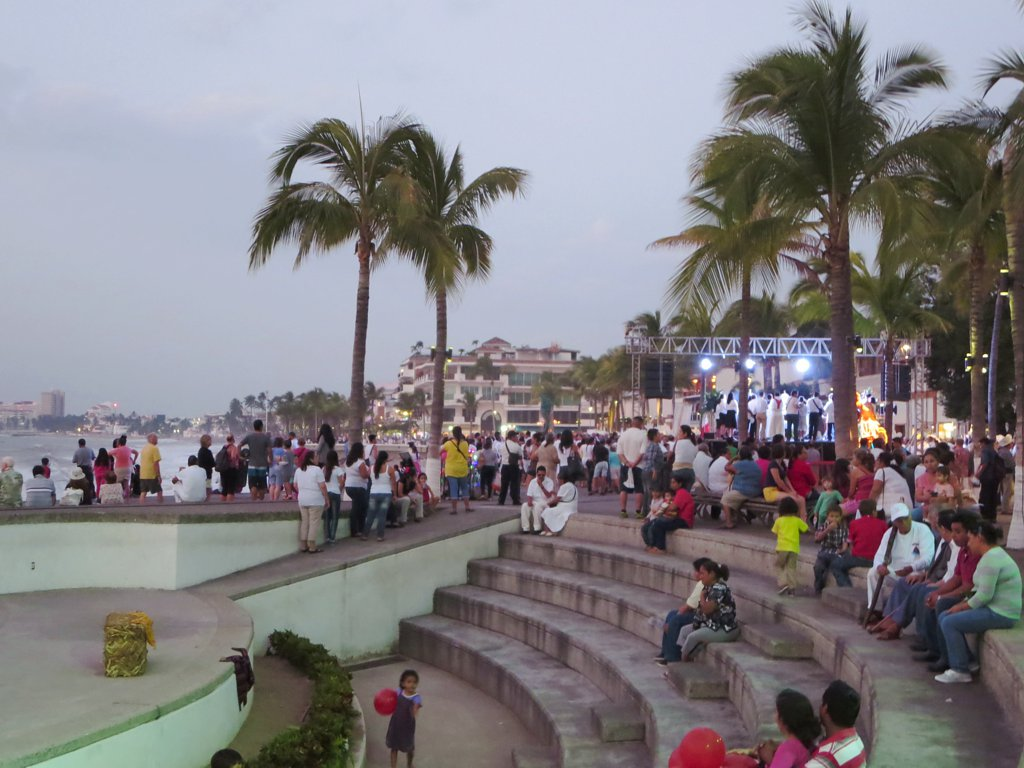
Los Arcos

Centro features Mercado Municipal Río Cuale and Rosita Beach. The district has many landmarks, including the Church of Our Lady of Guadalupe, Los Arcos, the Malecón and its many sculptures, Plaza de Armas, and Presidencia Municipal de Puerto Vallarta.

=== Public art ===
Sculptures along the Malecón include:

- The Boy on the Seahorse by Rafael Zamarripa
- Erizados (2006) by Maritza Vazquez
- Friendship Fountain (1987) by James "Bud" Bottoms and Octavio González
- The Good Fortune Unicorn by Anibal Riebeling
- In Search of Reason (2000) by Sergio Bustamante
- Millennium (2001) by Mathis Lidice (also known as Félix Fernando Baños López)
- Nature as Mother by Adrian Reynoso
- Nostalgia (1984) by Ramiz Barquet
- Origin and Destination (2011) by Pedro Tello
- Rain by Jovian
- The Rotunda by the Sea (1996) by Alejandro Colunga
- statue of Francis of Assisi by Augusto Bozzano
- statue of Paschal Baylón by Ramiz Barquet
- The Subtle Stone Eater (2006) by Jonás Gutiérrez
- Tritón y Sirena (1990) by Carlos Espino
- Vallarta Dancers by Jim Demetro

Previously, the statue of Lorena Ochoa (2012) was also installed along the Malecón. Plaza de Armas has a statue of Ignacio Vallarta, and Elizabeth Taylor and Richard Burton is installed at Casa Kimberly. The Minstrel's Corner is installed at the intersection of Galeana and Hidalgo streets.
