= Rosita Beach =

Beach in Centro, Puerto Vallarta, Jalisco, Mexico

- Beach
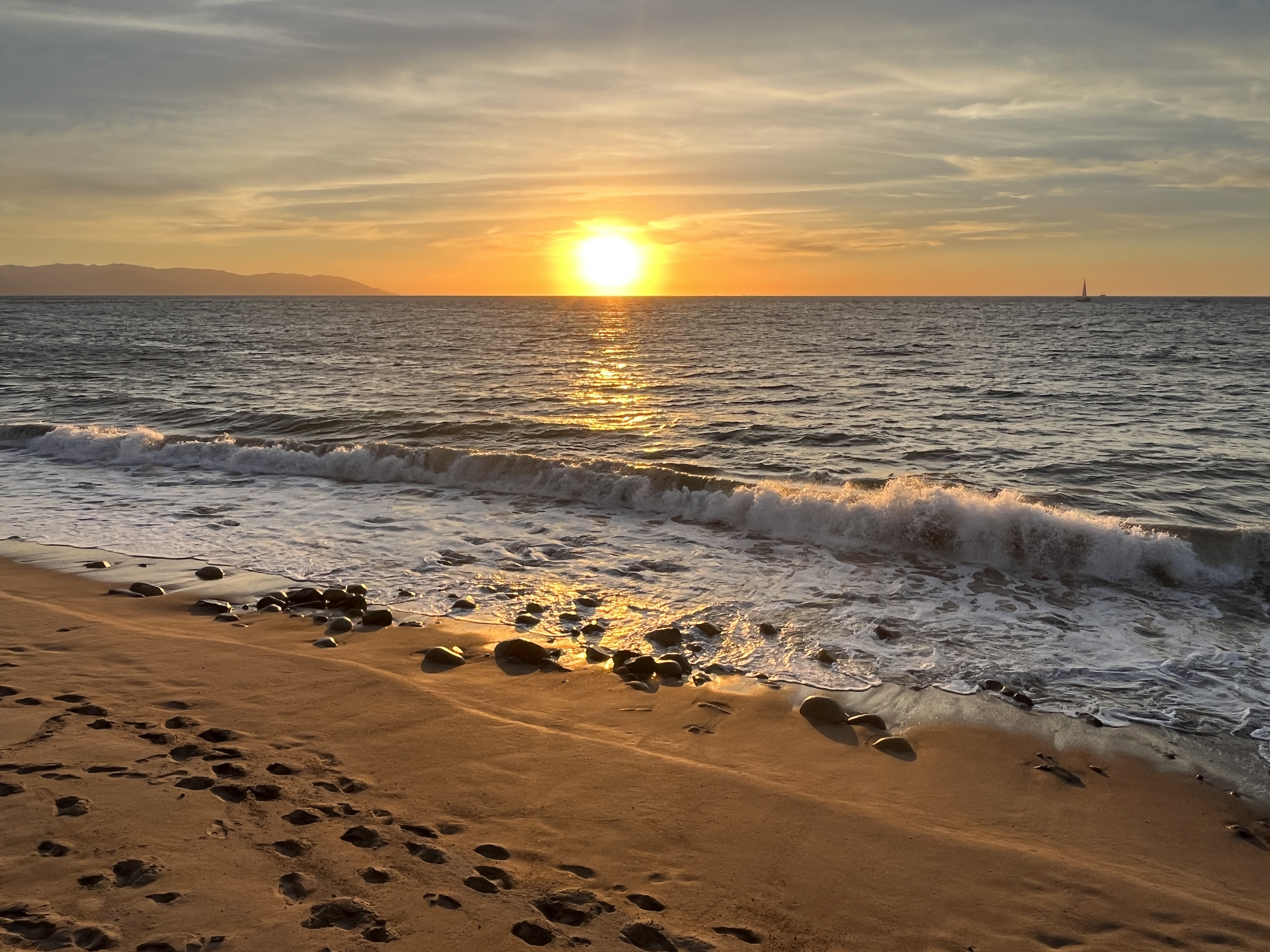
- Sunset at the beach, 2023

- Coordinates: 20°36′46″N 105°14′3″W
- Location: Centro, Puerto Vallarta, Jalisco, Mexico

Rosita Beach is a beach in Centro, Puerto Vallarta, in the Mexican state of Jalisco. The beach borders the Malecón and shares a name with one of the city's oldest hotels. Playa Camarones is to the north and Playa Olas Altas is to the south.
