= Statue of Francis of Assisi (Puerto Vallarta) =

Sculpture by Augusto Bozzano in Puerto Vallarta, Jalisco, Mexico

Saint Francis of Assisi in Extasis
- San Francisco de Asís en Éxtasis (Spanish)
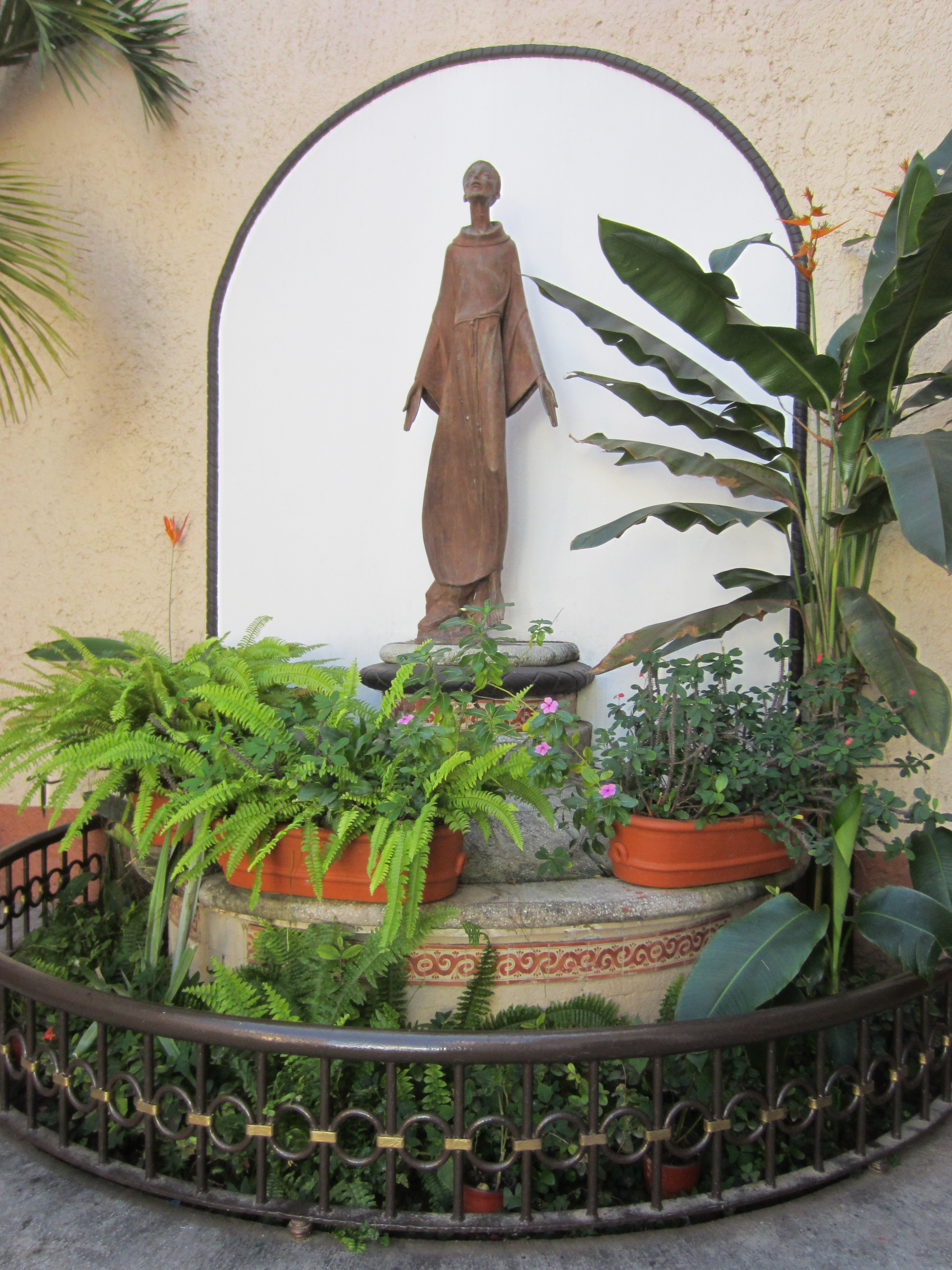
- The sculpture in 2014
- Artist: Augusto Bozzano
- Location: Puerto Vallarta, Jalisco, Mexico; 20°36′30″N 105°14′05″W

A statue of Francis of Assisi by Augusto Bozzano, called Saint Francis of Assisi in Extasis (Spanish: San Francisco de Asís en Éxtasis), is installed outside Puerto Vallarta's Church of Our Lady of Guadalupe, in the Mexican state of Jalisco.

== Description ==
The "slender" statue of Francis of Assisi is installed in a courtyard on the north side of the Church of Our Lady of Guadalupe, in Centro, Puerto Vallarta.

== History ==
The sculpture was created by Augusto Bozzano and donated to the city and parish by Ramiz Barquet.

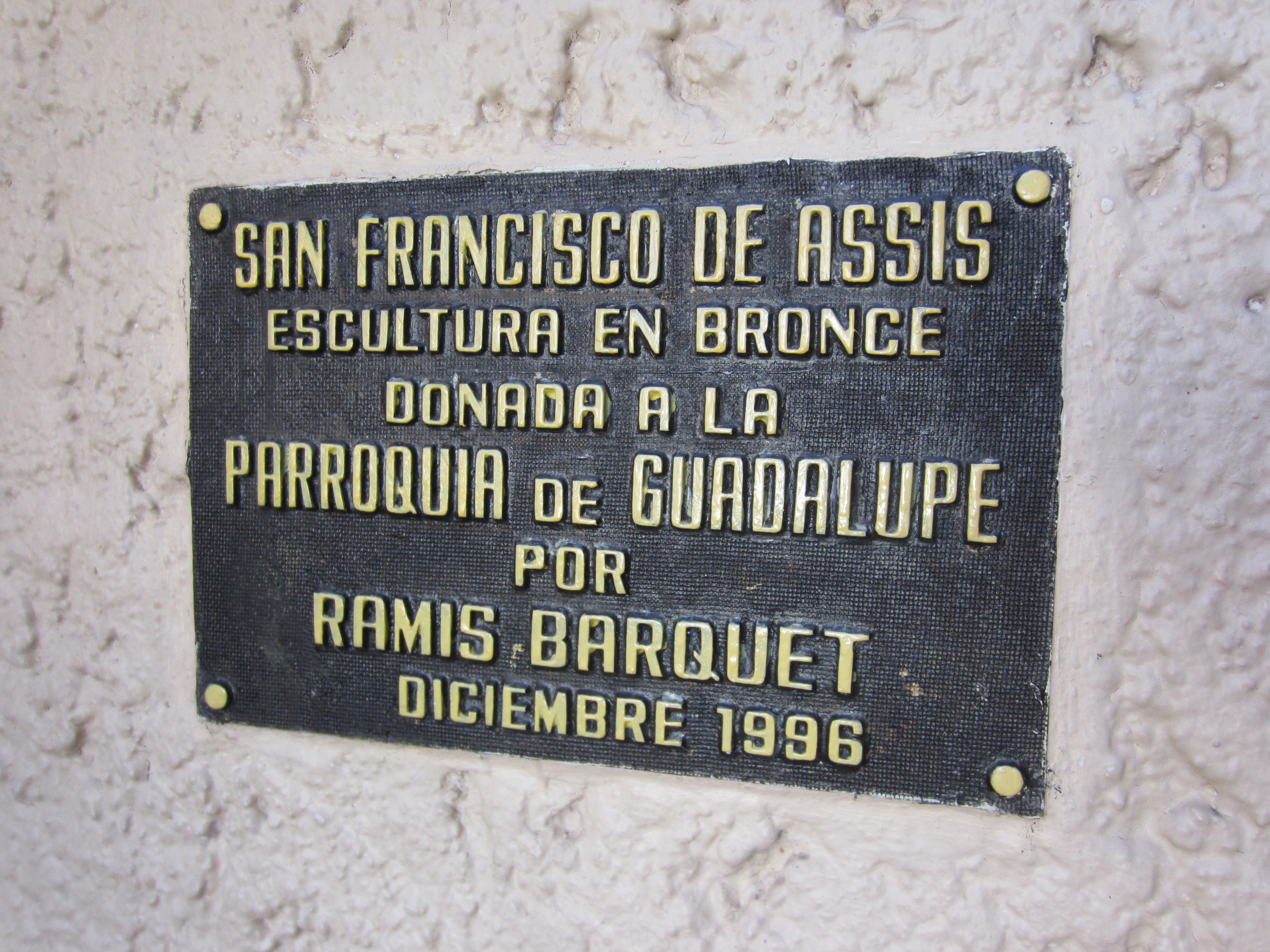

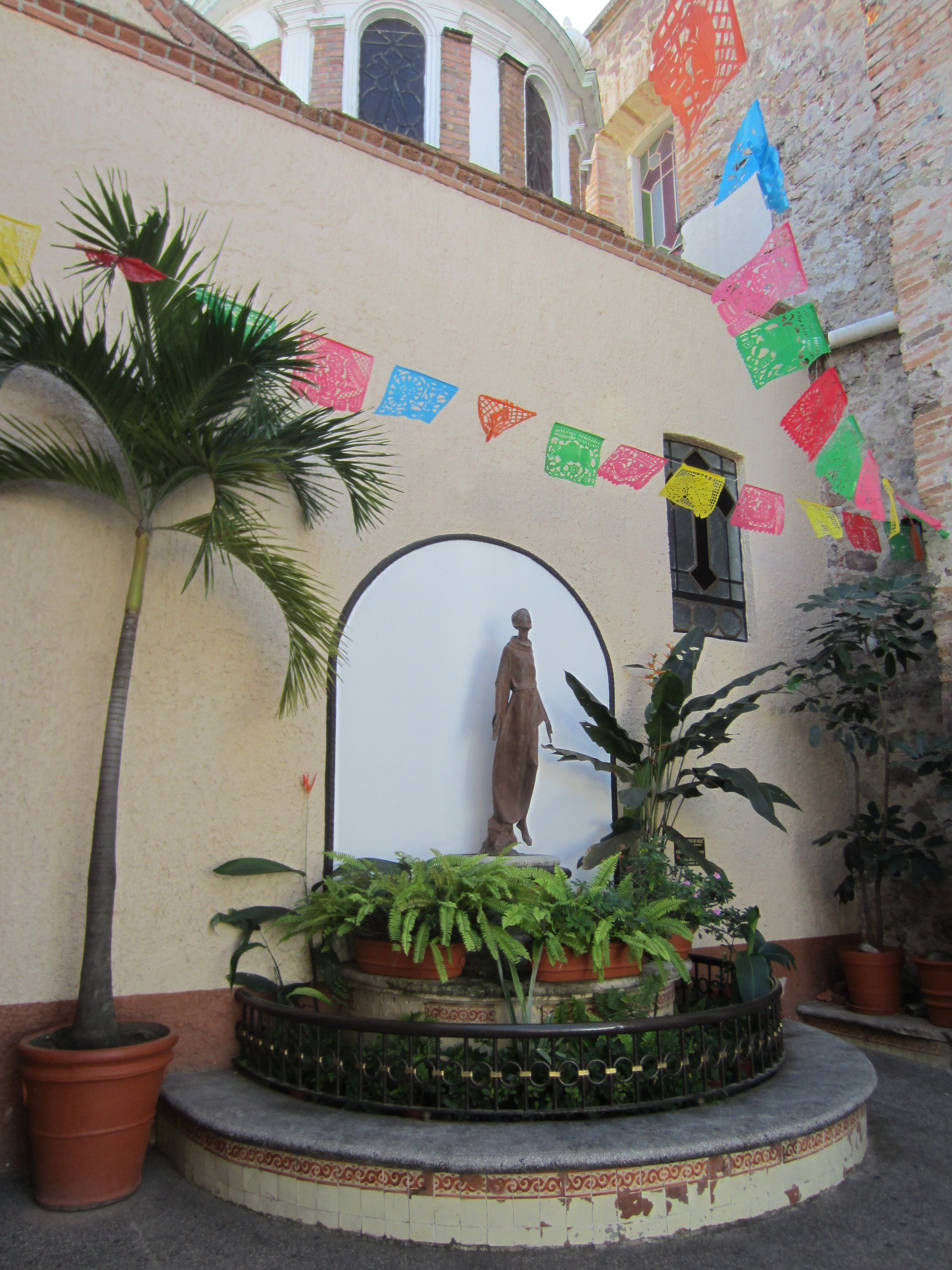
