= Mercado Municipal Río Cuale =

Market in Puerto Vallarta, Jalisco, Mexico

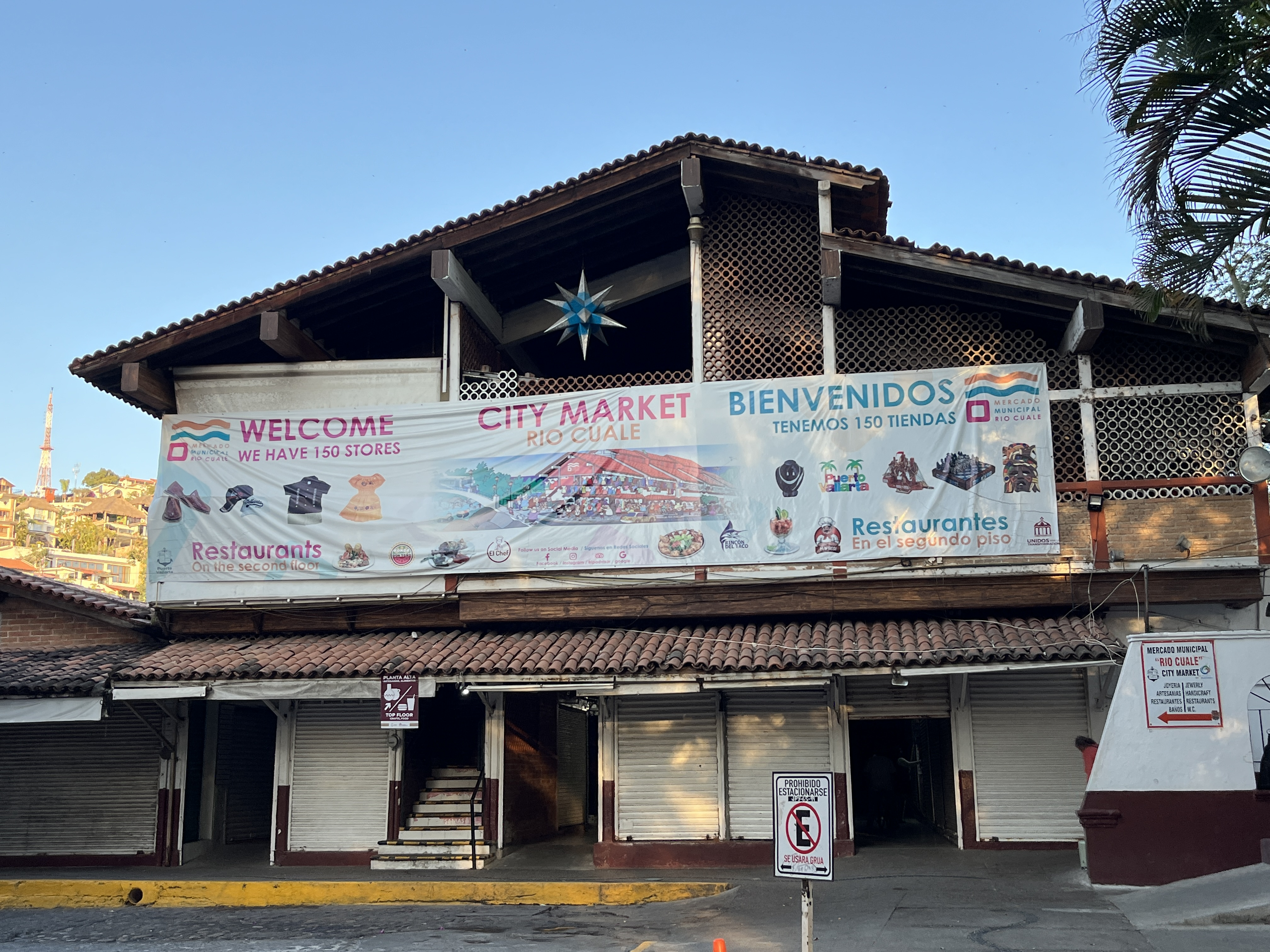
- The market's exterior, 2023
- Location: Puerto Vallarta, Jalisco, Mexico
- Location within Mexico
- Coordinates: 20.60634°N 105.2351°W

Mercado Municipal Río Cuale is a market in Centro, Puerto Vallarta, in the Mexican state of Jalisco. It was founded in 1957. It is slated to undergo a major renovation in 2026.
