= The Minstrel's Corner =

Sculpture in Puerto Vallarta, Jalisco, Mexico

- Spanish: La Rinconada del Juglar
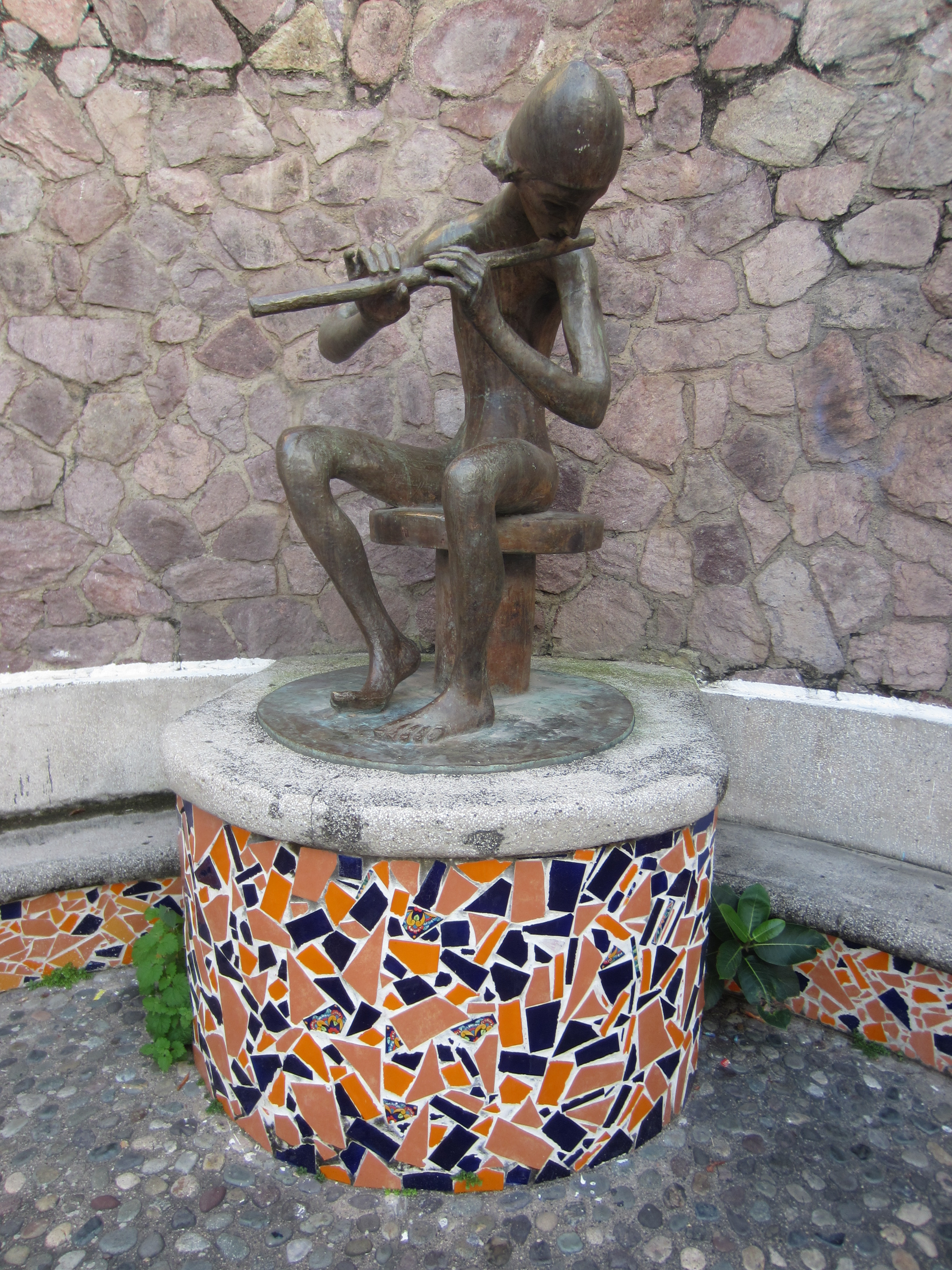
- The sculpture in 2021
- Artist: José Ramiz Barquet
- Year: 1999
- Location: Puerto Vallarta, Jalisco, Mexico
- 20°36′34.7″N 105°14′2″W

The Minstrel's Corner (Spanish: La Rinconada del Juglar) is a sculpture by Jose Ramiz Barquet, installed in Centro, Puerto Vallarta, in the Mexican state of Jalisco.

Located at the intersection of Galeana and Hidalgo Streets, the statue depicts a minstrel playing a flute. It was dedicated in May 1999. A seating area was created around the artwork.
