= 5 de Diciembre =

Neighborhood of Puerto Vallarta, Jalisco, Mexico

- colonia

- Location within Mexico
- Coordinates: 20.617151°N 105.229034°W
- Country: Mexico

Population
  - Total: 5,580

5 de Diciembre

5 de Diciembre is a colonia (neighborhood) in Puerto Vallarta, in the Mexican state of Jalisco.

== Description and features ==
The neighborhood is north of Centro and features Hotel Rosita, Playa Camarones, Plaza Hidalgo, and Parroquia Nuestra Señora del Refugio. The colonia is home to many ex-pats. Residents have complained about the presence of sex workers.
