= Casa Kimberly =

Hotel in Puerto Vallarta, Jalisco, Mexico

- Logo

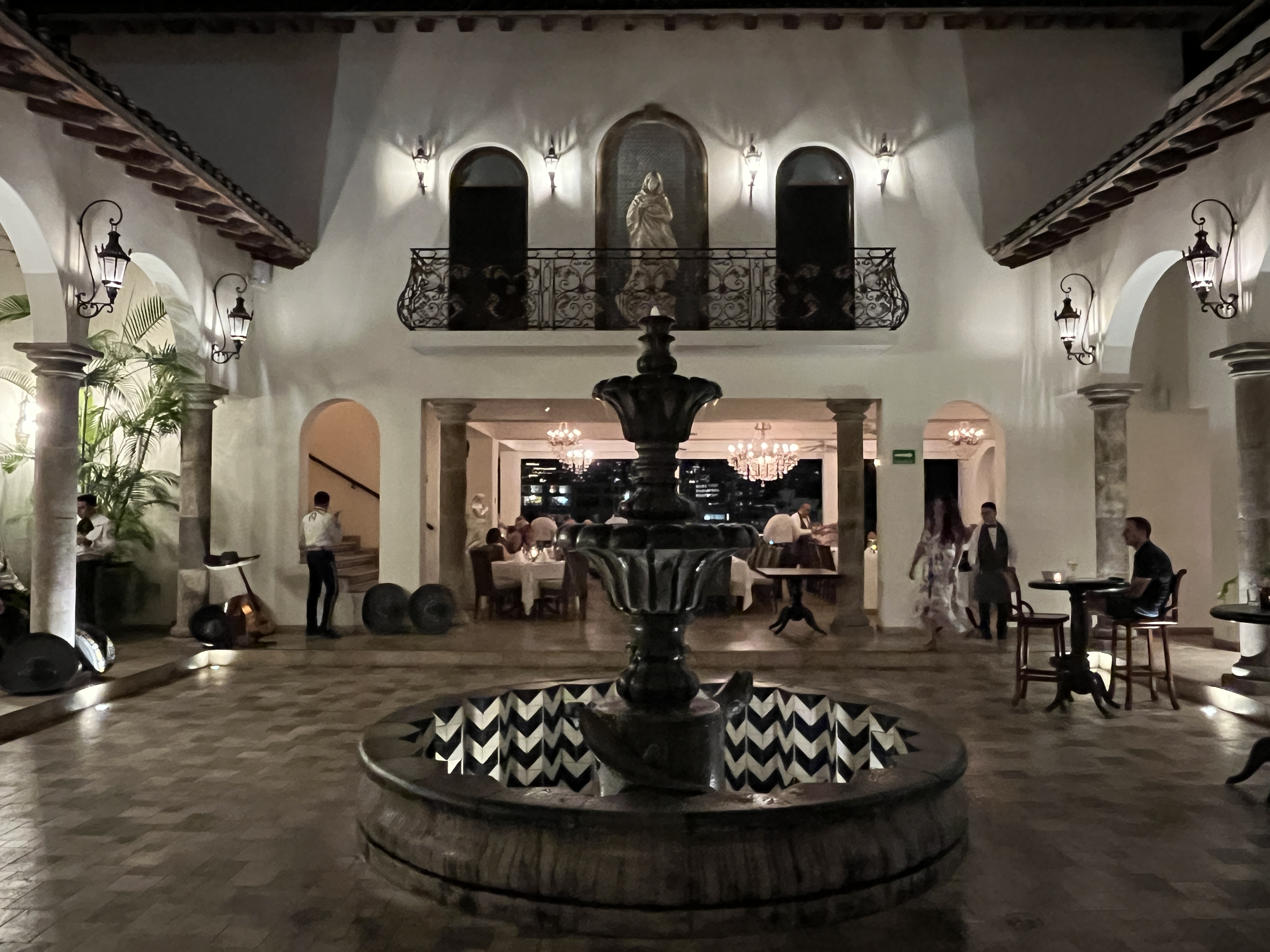
- Courtyard, 2023

General information
- Location: Puerto Vallarta, Jalisco, Mexico
- Coordinates: 20.6070°N 105.2333°W

Casa Kimberly (previously Casa Kimberley) is a hotel and former residence of Richard Burton and Elizabeth Taylor, located in Puerto Vallarta, in the Mexican state of Jalisco. The hotel houses Iguana Restaurant. Elizabeth Taylor and Richard Burton by Jim and Christina Demetro is installed outside the restaurant.

== Description ==
Casa Kimberly is a boutique hotel in Puerto Vallarta's Gringo Gulch, operating in the former residences of Richard Burton and Elizabeth Taylor. The hotel has nine suites, a pool, and a spa. According to Jimmy Im of The Hollywood Reporter, Casa Kimberly has "blue-and-white tiled staircases, stone columns, arched doorways, wrap-around terraces and al fresco courtyards with bubbling fountains. All suites and public spaces are adorned with 19th-century antiques, from Italian paintings and horse carriages to a marble statue carved by French sculptor Gustave Deloye." He also wrote, "The suites are individually designed, furnished with chandeliers and four-post beds while bathrooms feature high, brick-domed ceilings and claw-foot tubs; two suites — Cleopatra and Velvet — stand out with expansive terraces equipped with jacuzzis that harbor panoramic views of Banderas Bay."

=== Iguana Restaurant ===
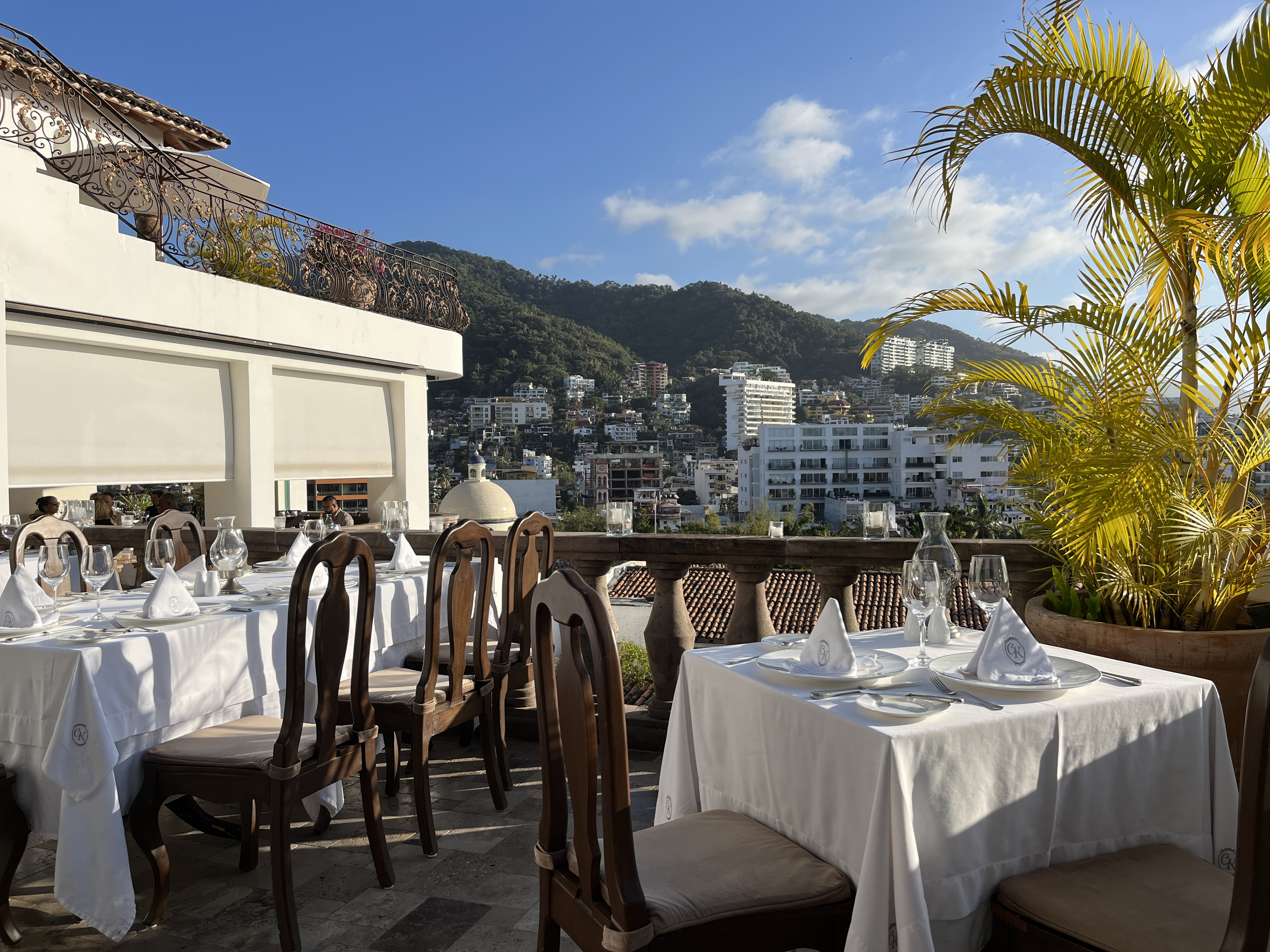
Outdoor seating, 2023

The Iguana Restaurant, named after the film The Night of the Iguana (1964), is also housed in the hotel. The restaurant serves Mexican cuisine and, according to Denise Dias of The Toronto Star, has an "understated elegant atmosphere ... inspired by traditional Colonial Mexican design and accented with sparks of Hollywood glamour".

The interior features artwork depicting Taylor and the menu has included fish, steak, huevos a la mexicana, and fruit. Barbara Ramsay of The Globe and Mail wrote, "The wine list leans toward Mexican wines, which can be a gamble, but there are some good Chilean and Californian choices. There is also a tequila bar where guests can explore the intricacies of the country's most famous tipple."

== History ==
Taylor sold the property during the 1990s. Janice Chatterton, a hotelier who owns Burton's property, acquired the house. The boutique hotel was formed by the two houses, which Burton connected by a bridge known as Lovers' Bridge or Reconciliation Bridge.

== Reception ==
The Telegraph has rated the hotel 8 out of 10.
