= Parroquia Nuestra Señora del Refugio =

Church in Puerto Vallarta, Jalisco, Mexico

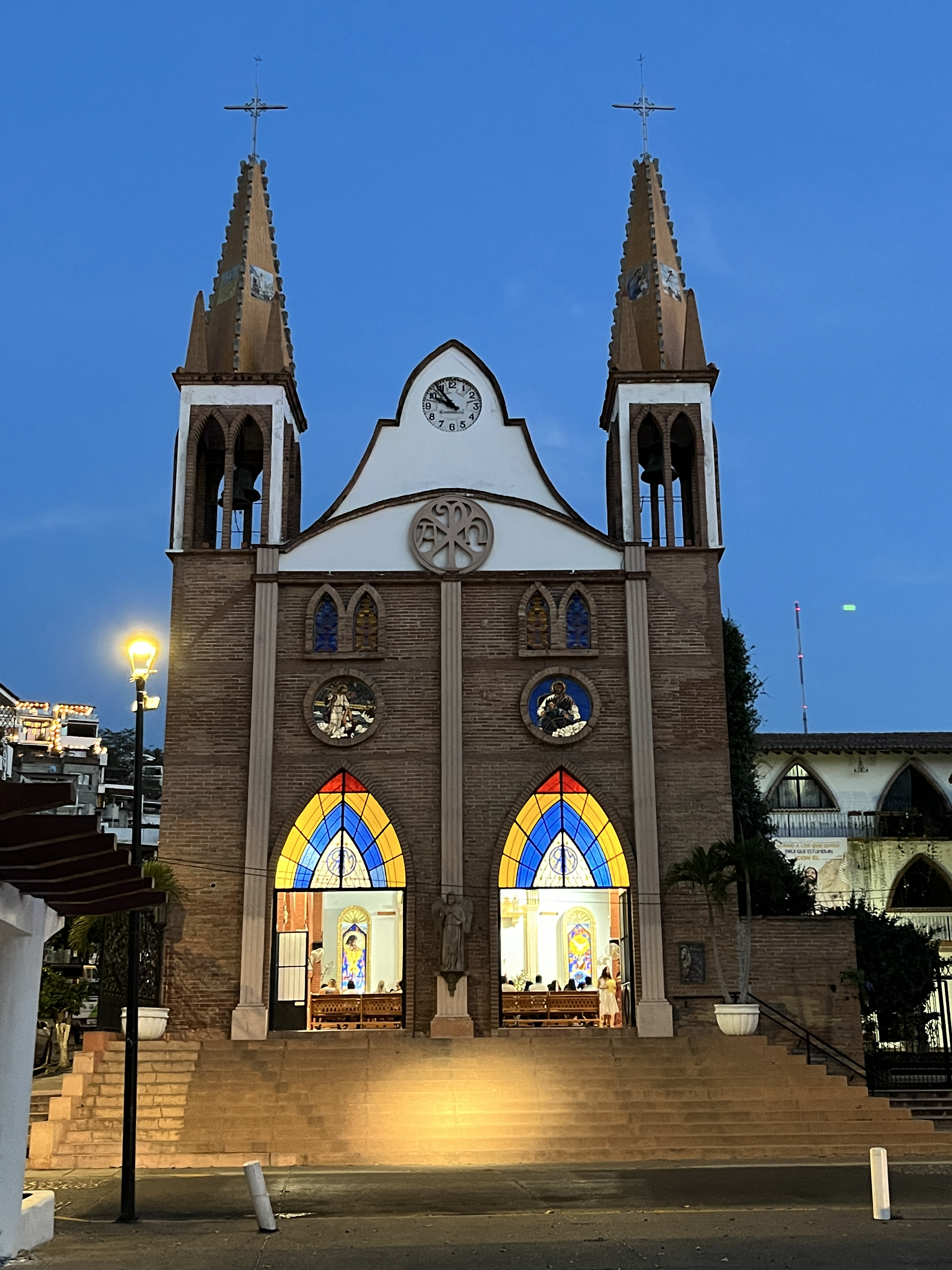
- The church's exterior in 2023

- Location within Mexico

Location
- Municipality: Puerto Vallarta
- State: Jalisco
- Country: Mexico
- Interactive map of Parroquia Nuestra Señora del Refugio
- Coordinates: 20°36′53″N 105°13′52″W

Parroquia de Nuestra Señora del Refugio is a church in Puerto Vallarta's 5 de Diciembre neighborhood, in the Mexican state of Jalisco. The church is across the street from Plaza Hidalgo.
