= Plaza Hidalgo =

Plaza in Puerto Vallarta, Jalisco, Mexico

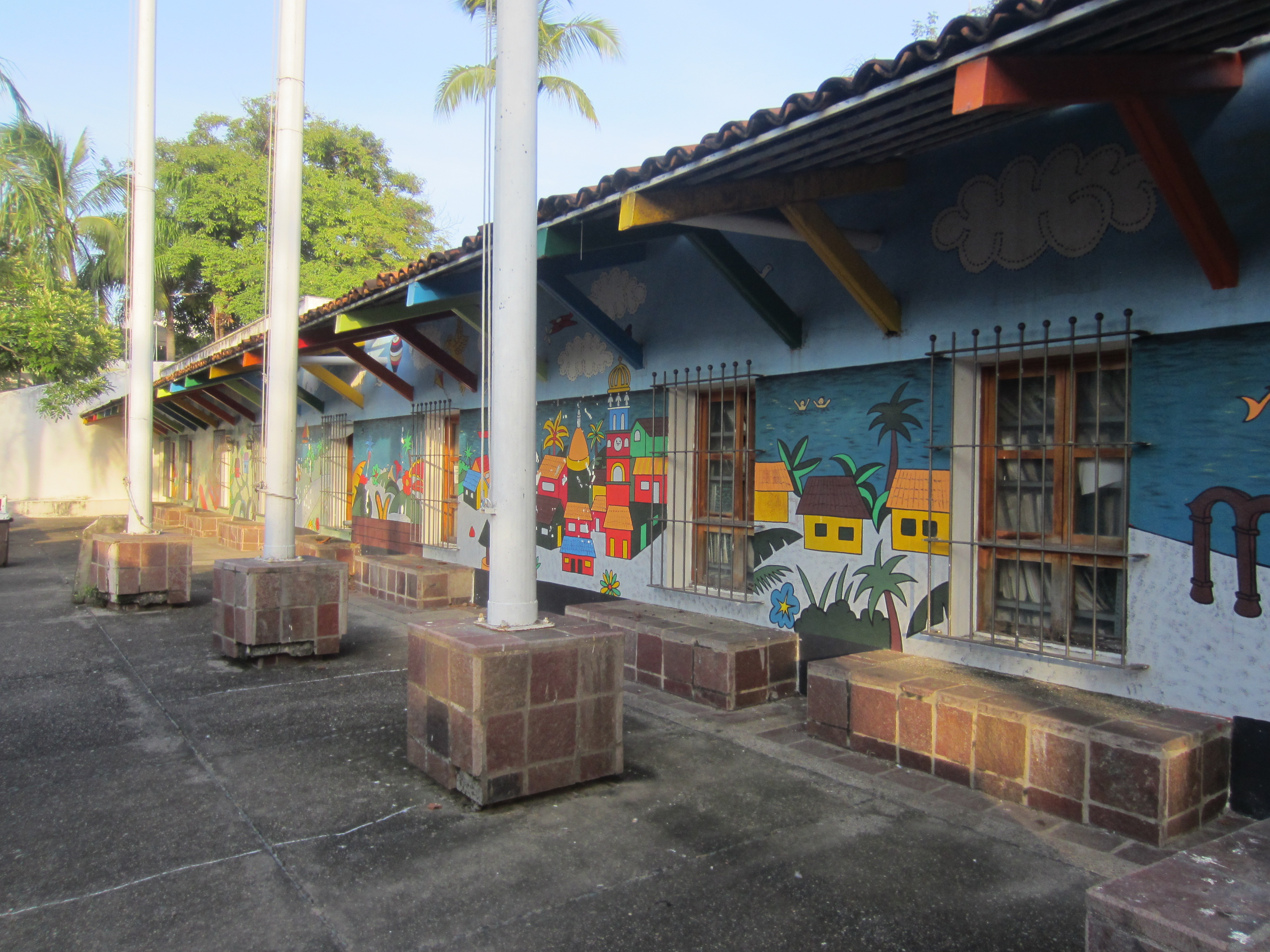
- Location: Puerto Vallarta, Jalisco, Mexico
- Location within Mexico
- Coordinates: 20°36′54″N 105°13′55″W

Plaza Hidalgo is an urban plaza in colonia 5 de Diciembre, in Puerto Vallarta, in the Mexican state of Jalisco. Neighboring the Parroquia Nuestra Señora del Refugio, the plaza is named after Miguel Hidalgo y Costilla, leader of the Mexican War of Independence. Also, there is a statue that honors Hidalgo. Underground, there is a public parking lot.

== History ==
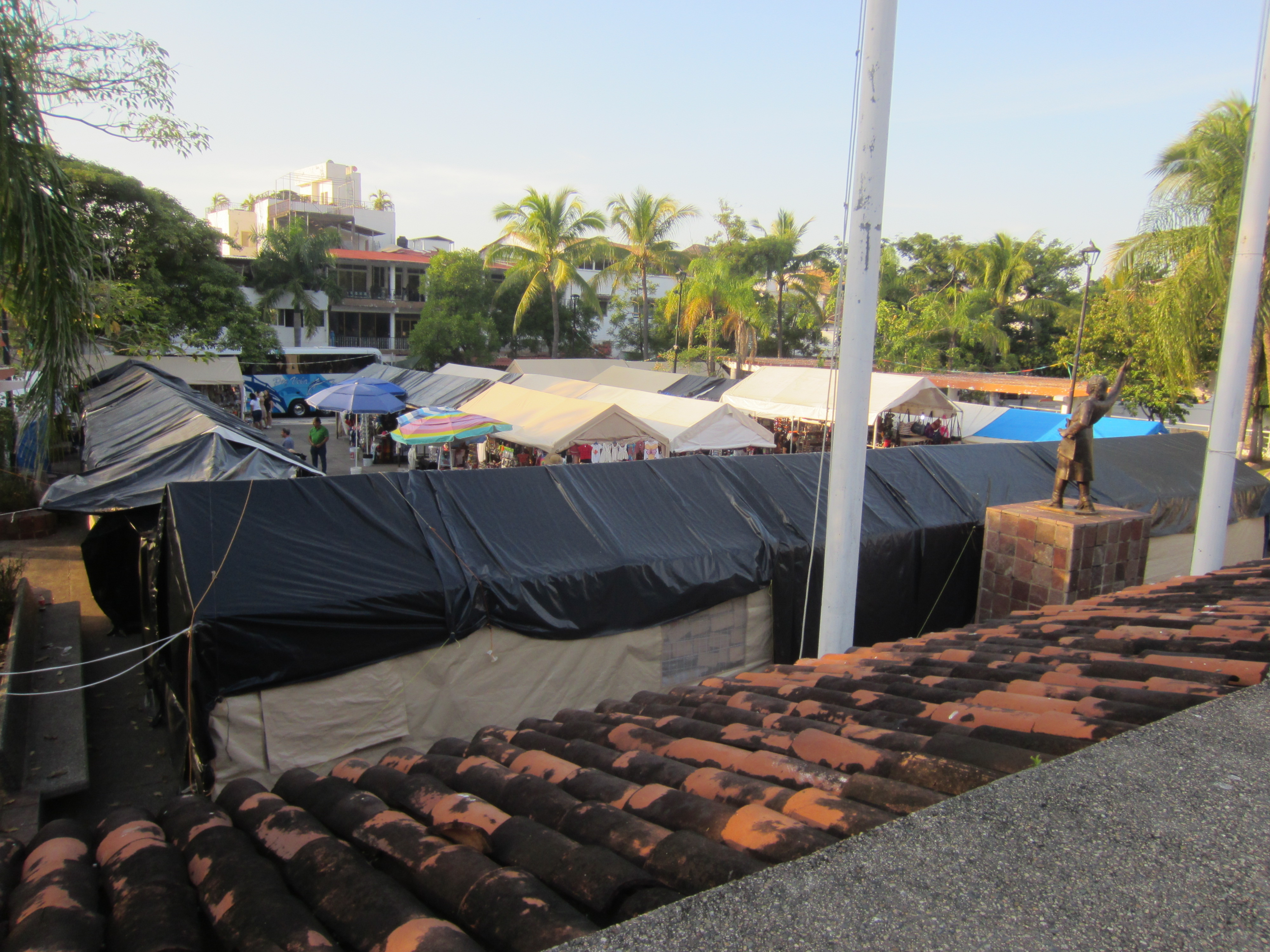
Market vendors in the plaza in 2021, during the COVID-19 pandemic

During the COVID-19 pandemic in Mexico, the plaza was temporarily closed. The government of Puerto Vallarta later allowed market vendors to move there after the Cuale River flooded their workplace when Hurricane Nora hit in 2021. The plaza has appeared on The Amazing Race.

== Public art ==
The plaza features a bronze statue of Miguel Hidalgo y Costilla by José Esteban Ramírez Guareño. It was installed in 1988 and it replaced the idea of placing the same model in concrete.

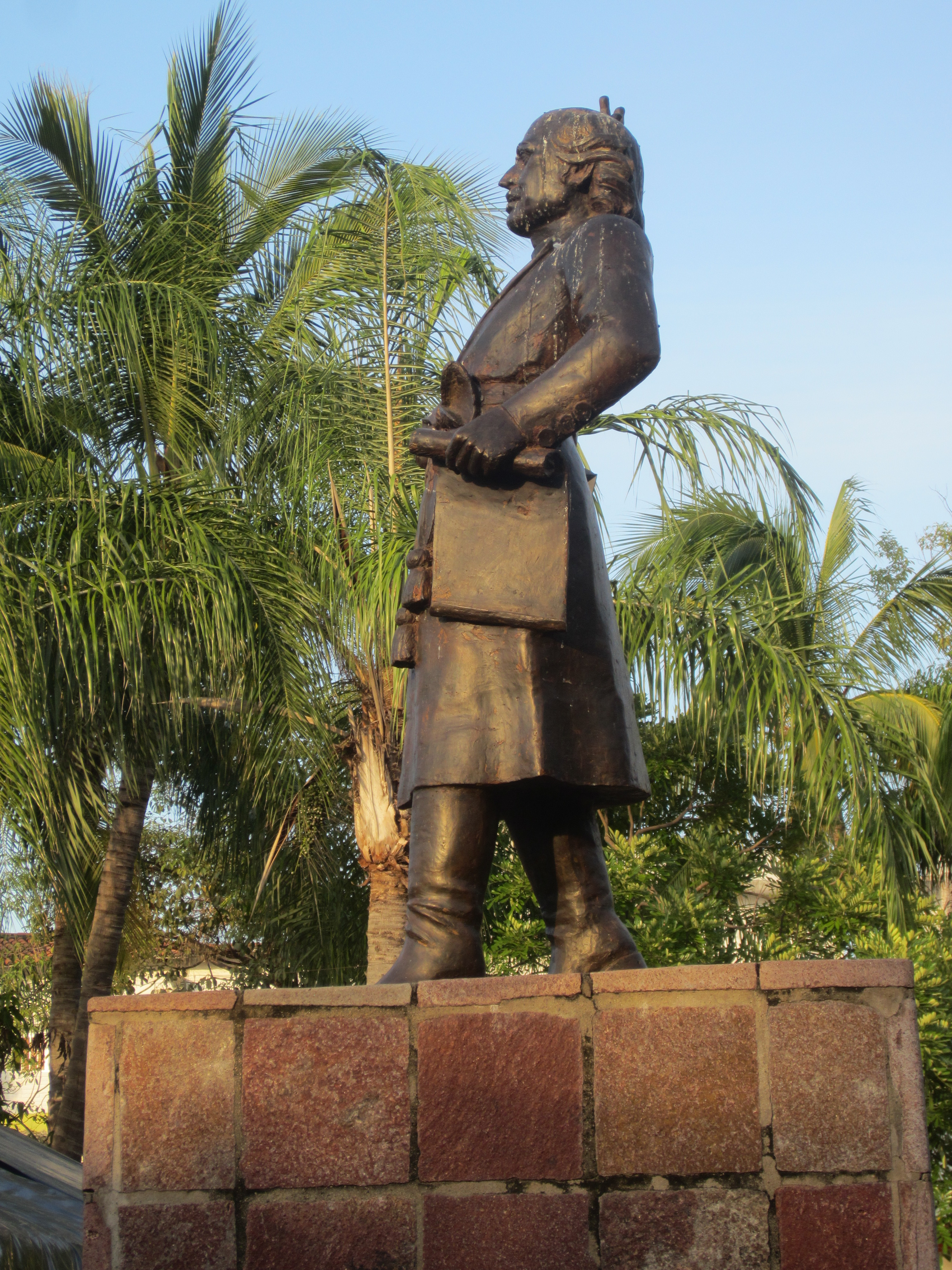
Statue of Miguel Hidalgo y Costilla

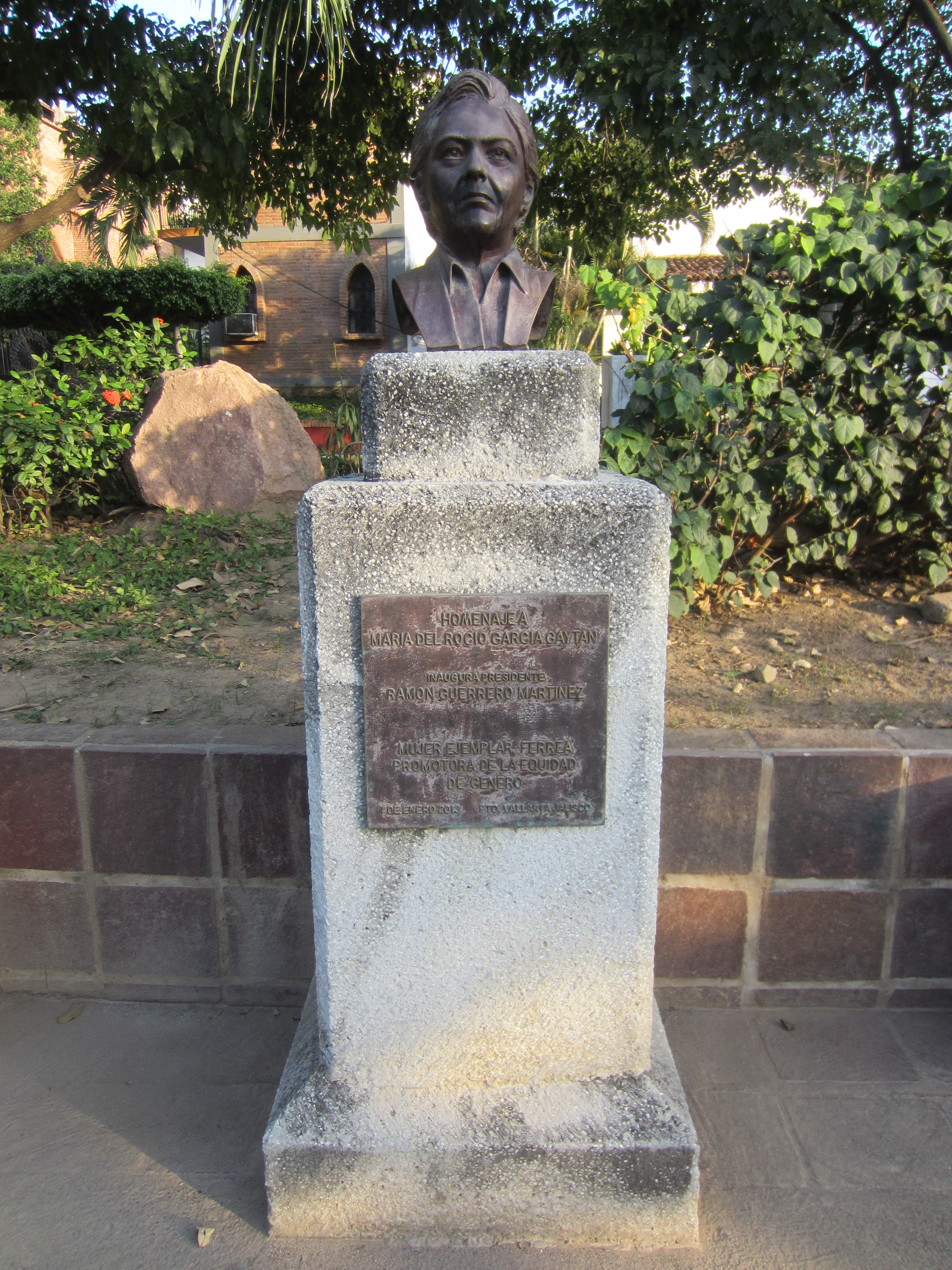
Bust

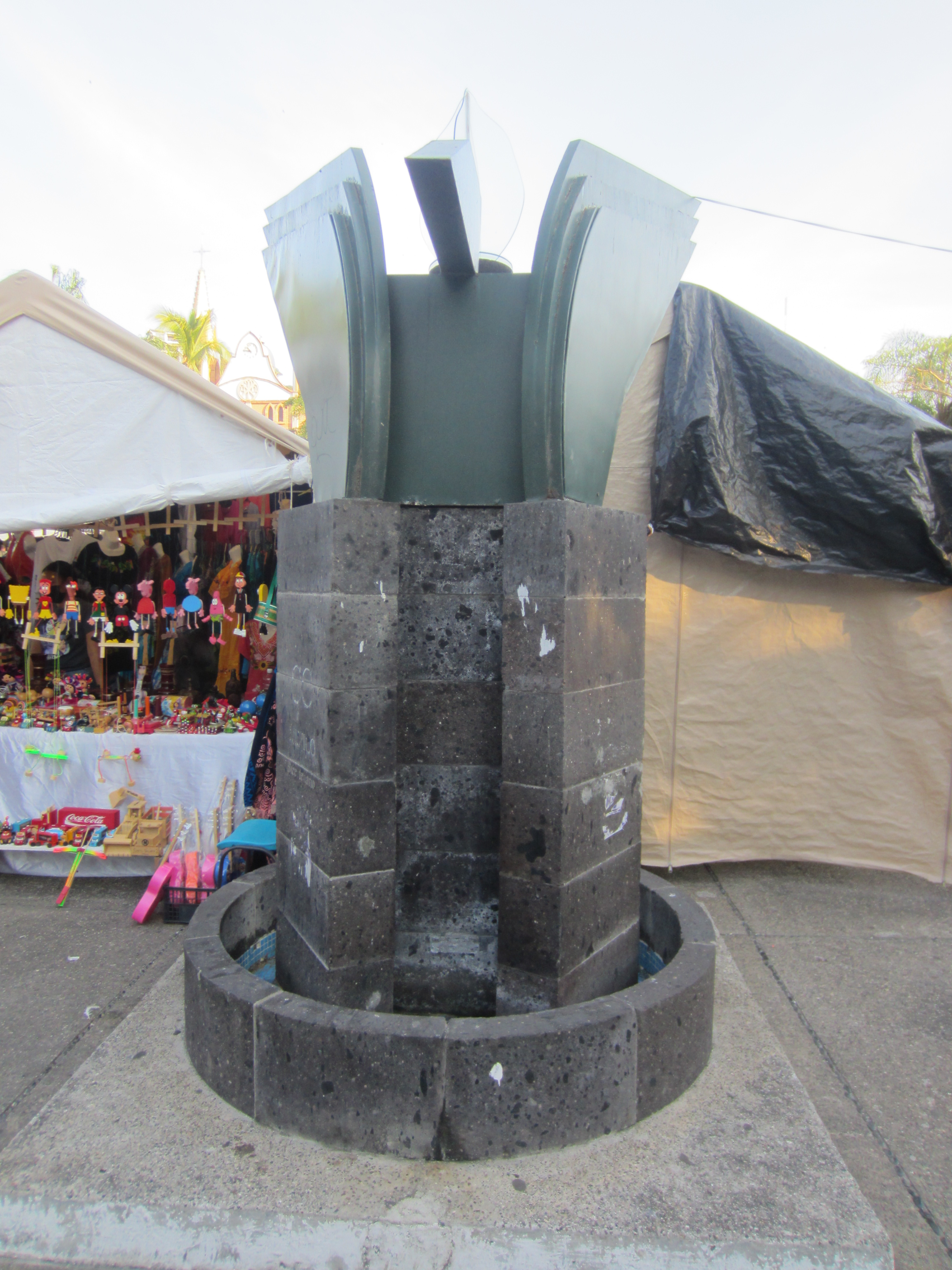
