= Nicolás Enríquez =

Mexican painter

Nicolás Enríquez de Vargas (1704-1790) was a New Spanish painter. He was student of Juan Rodríguez Juárez.

== Biography ==
We only have information of Enríquez from 1722. In 1728 along with José de Ibarra supports the foundation of the Academia de Pintores (Painters Academy) in New Spain, which was the precedent of the Real Academia de San Carlos. The most of his work remains in Guadalajara.

== Works ==
- Matanza de los Santos Inocentes, 1737, Museo Soumaya.
- Retrato de Sor Juana Inés de la Cruz, Philadelphia Art Institute.

== Gallery ==
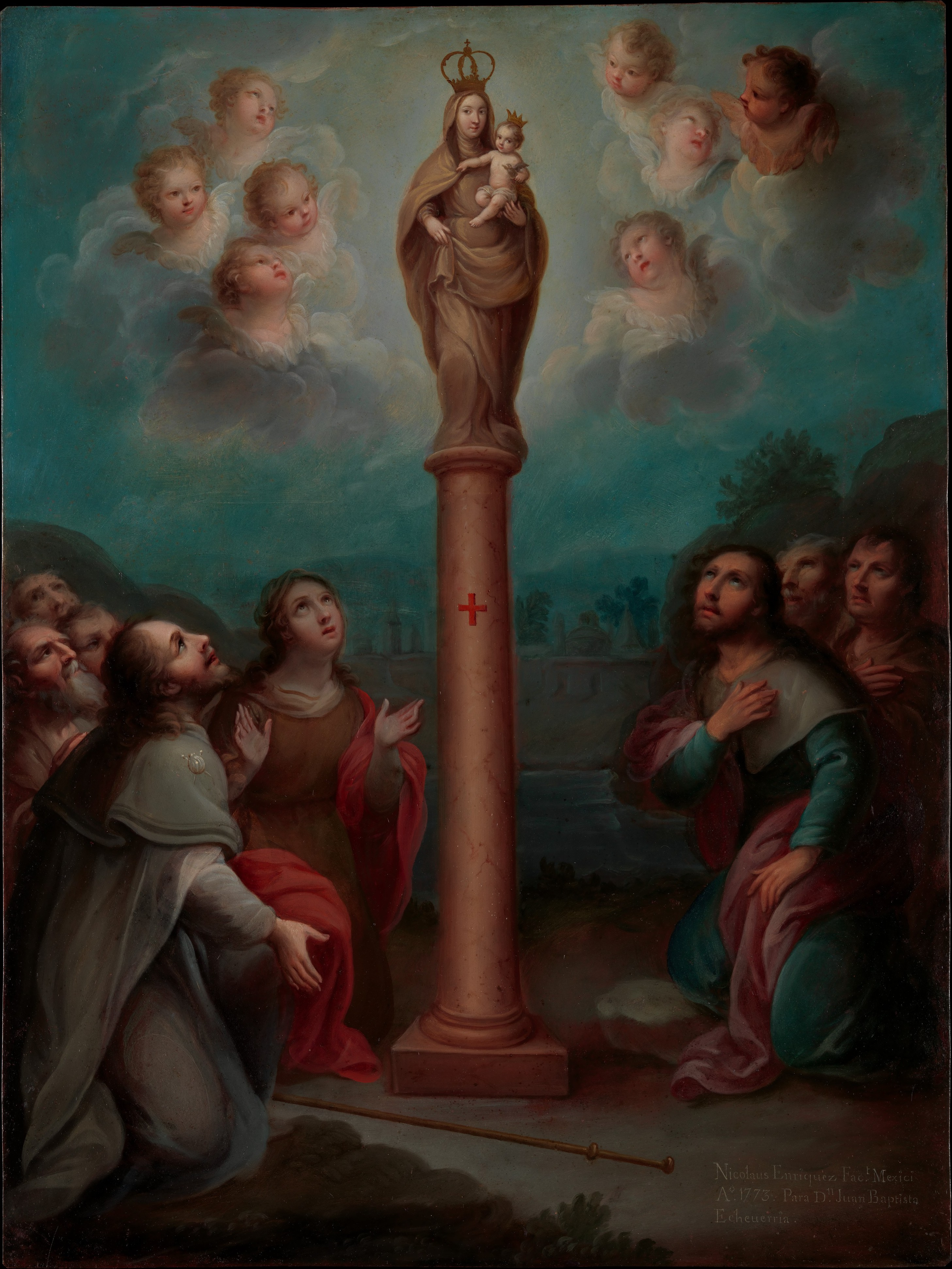
The Apparition of the Virgin of El Pilar to St. James, oil on copper, 56.5 × 41.9 cm, Metropolitan Museum of Art, NY, 1773

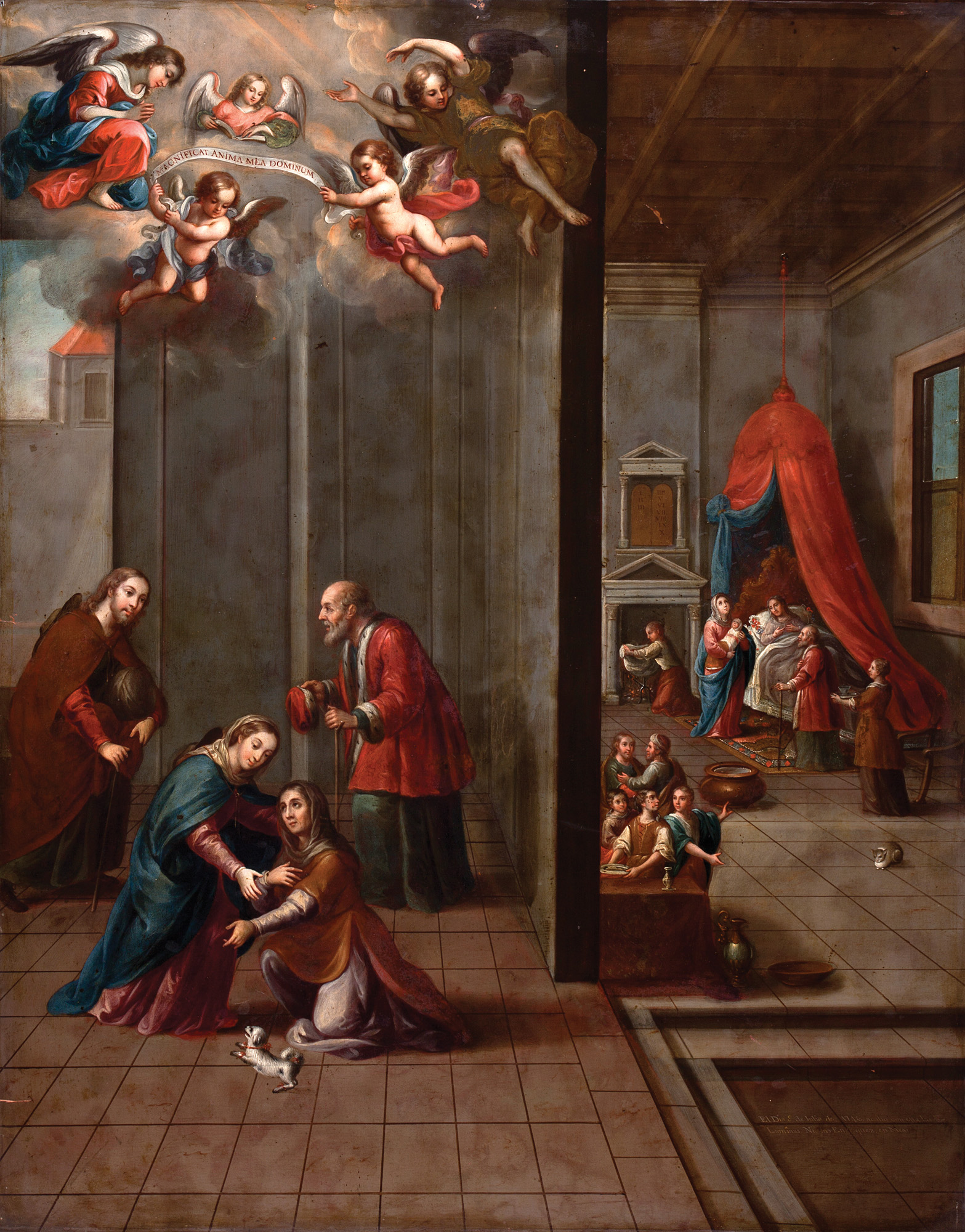
La Visitación y el Nacimiento de la Virgen, 1746, oil on copper, 106 x 84 cm.
