= Presidencia Municipal de Puerto Vallarta =

Government building in Puerto Vallarta, Jalisco, Mexico

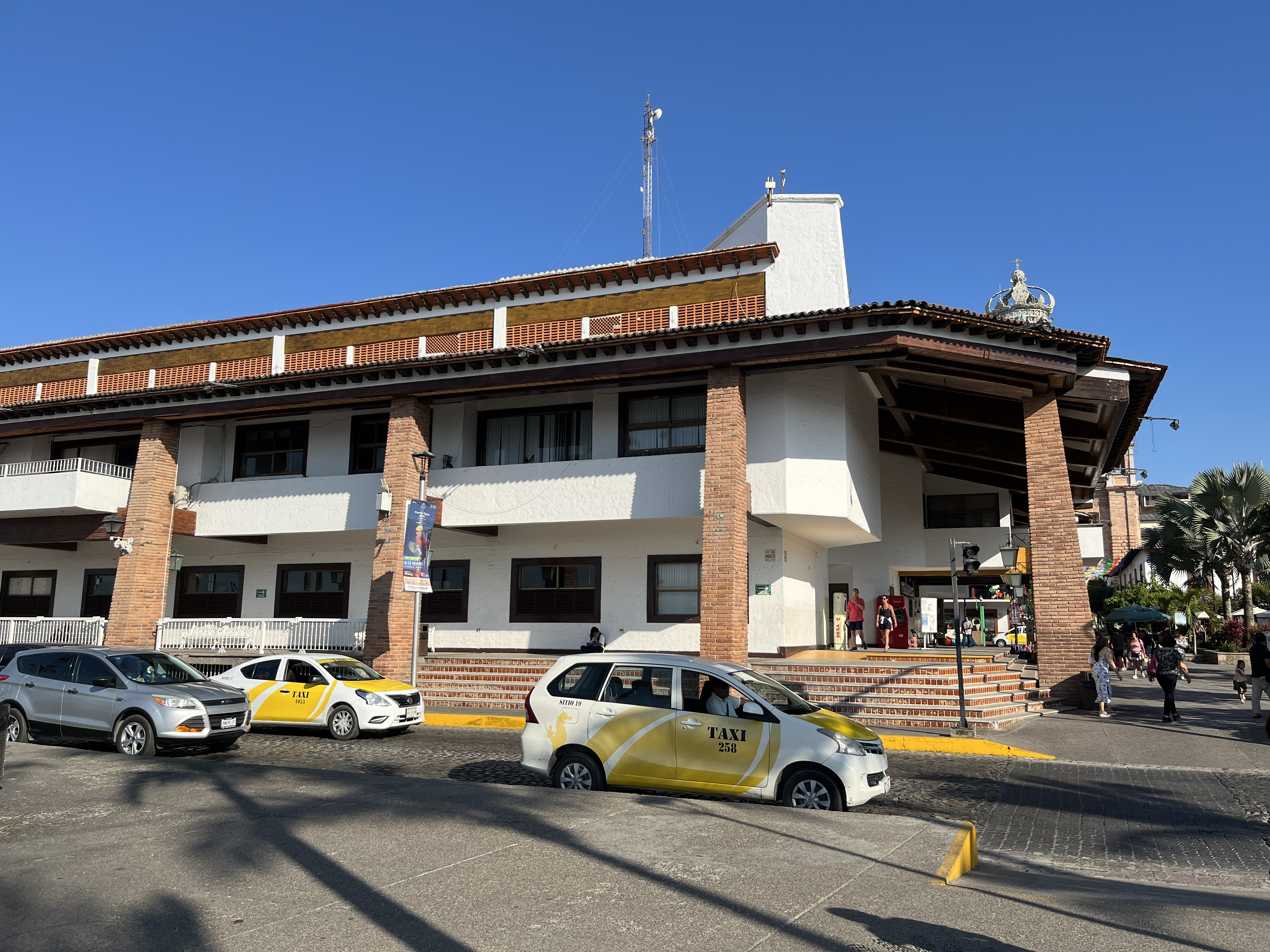
- The building's exterior, 2023
- Interactive map of the Presidencia Municipal de Puerto Vallarta area

General information
- Location: Puerto Vallarta, Jalisco, Mexico
- Coordinates: 20.6088°N 105.2355°W

Presidencia Municipal de Puerto Vallarta is a government building in Centro, Puerto Vallarta, in the Mexican state of Jalisco.

The interior features a mural by Manuel Lepe Macedo called Puerto Vallarta.

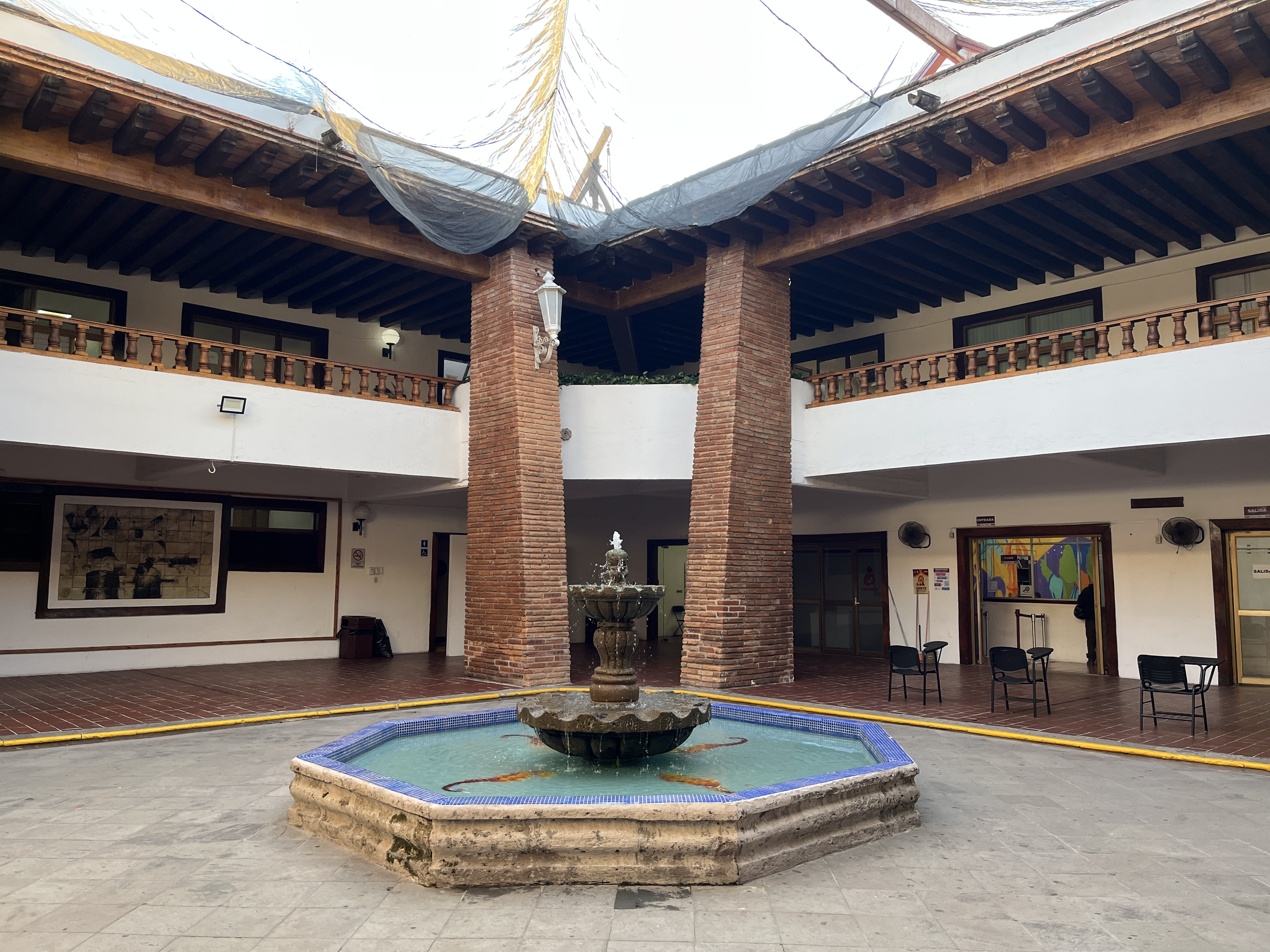
Interior courtyard, 2023

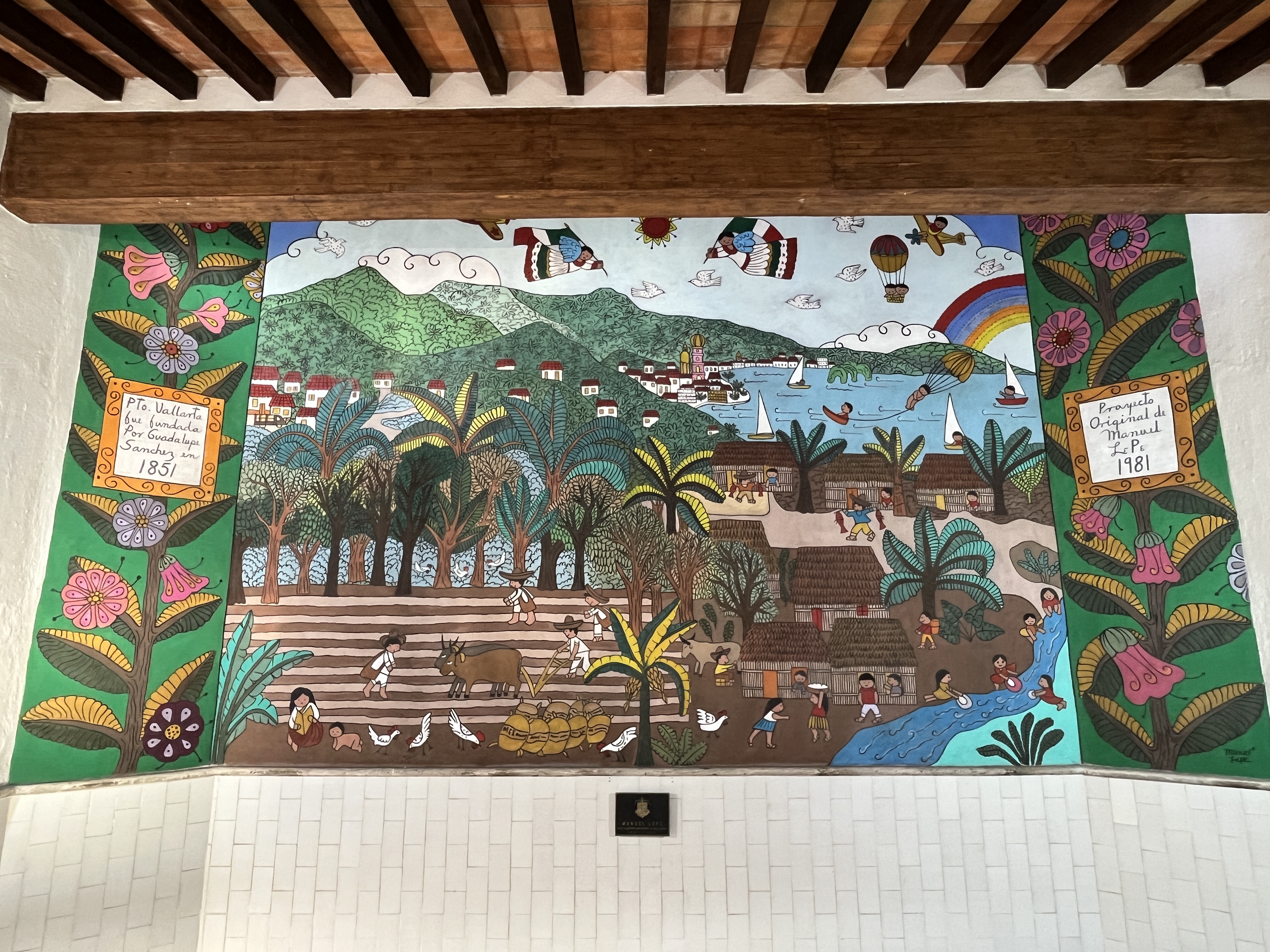
Manuel Lepe's mural Puerto Vallarta
