= Playa Camarones =

Beach in Puerto Vallarta, Jalisco, Mexico

- Beach

- Location within Mexico
- Coordinates: 20°37′8″N 105°13′56″W
- Location: Puerto Vallarta, Jalisco, Mexico

Playa Camarones (English: "Shrimp Beach") is a beach along Puerto Vallarta's 5 de Diciembre neighborhood, in the Mexican state of Jalisco.

The beach is about "90 feet wide and stretches for 2100 feet from the breakwater in front of Villa Premiere Hotel to the north." It offers several outdoor sports or activities such as SUP (Stand-Up Paddling), jet skiing, boat and horse riding, and parasailing. The nightlife in Playa Camarones can consist of bars with live music, nightclubs with DJs, and beachside restaurants.
