= Elizabeth Taylor and Richard Burton =

Statue by Jim and Christina Demetro in Puerto Vallarta, Mexico

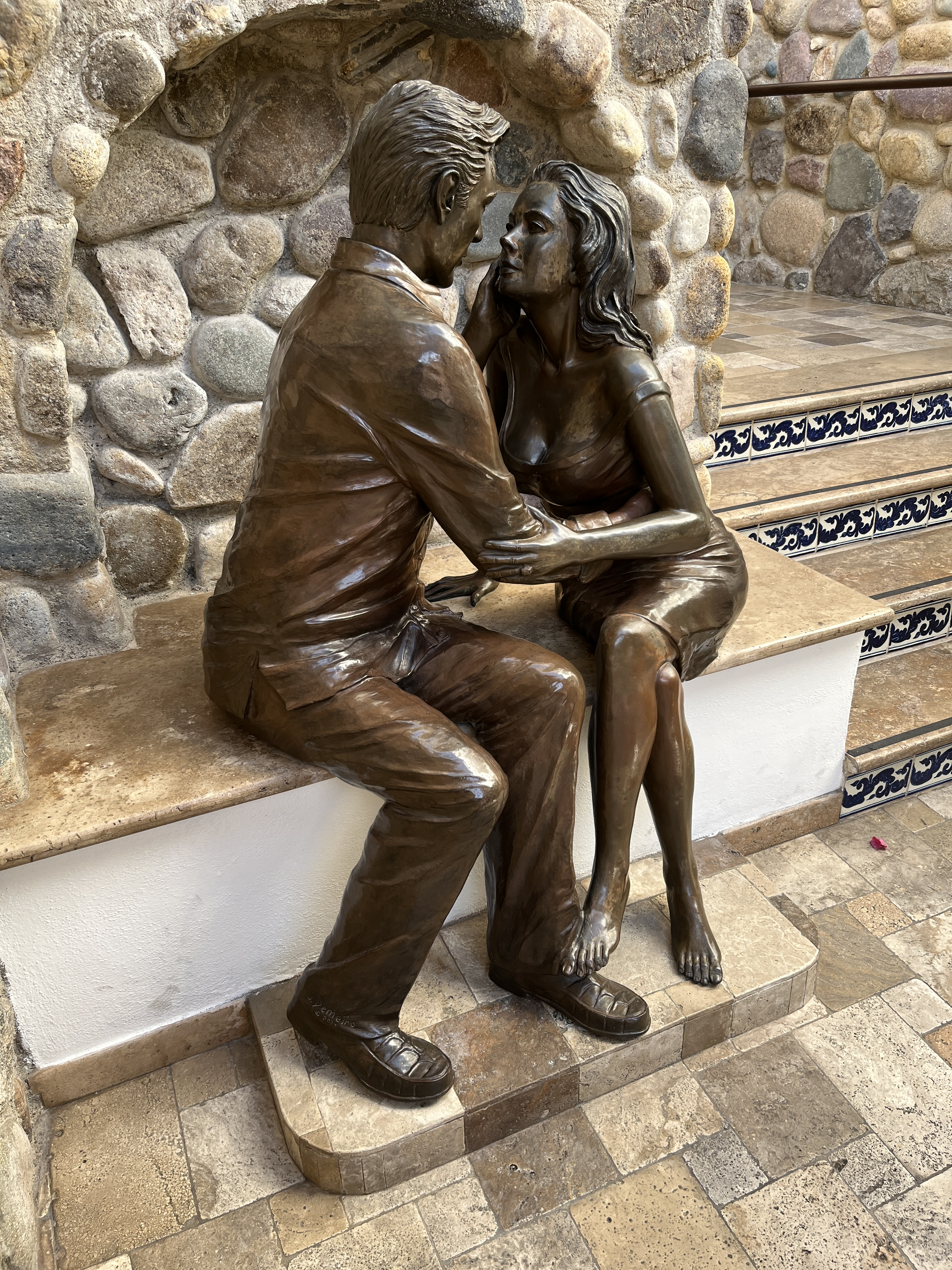
- The statue in 2023
- Artists: Jim and Christina Demetro
- Subject: Richard Burton; Elizabeth Taylor
- Location: Puerto Vallarta, Jalisco, Mexico; 20°36′24.9″N 105°13′59.8″W

Elizabeth Taylor and Richard Burton is a bronze sculpture by Jim and Christina Demetro, installed at Puerto Vallarta's Casa Kimberly, in the Mexican state of Jalisco.

== Description ==
The life-size bronze statue depicting Elizabeth Taylor and Richard Burton in a sitting position is installed at Casa Kimberly, a boutique hotel converted from Taylor's former residence.

== History ==
The artwork was commissioned by Janice Chatterton, the owner of Casa Kimberly and other properties. Jim Demetro created a smaller version, called Los Amantes – The Lovers, before completing one depicting Taylor and Burton. Multiple limited-edition bronze statuettes have been sold at Casa Kimberly and Demetro Galeria.

Elizabeth Taylor and Richard Burton was modeled using photographs and measurements of Taylor and Burton, as well as live models for the pose. The work was fabricated by Gulooch Foundry in El Pitillal. It was unveiled for the opening of Casa Kimberly's The Iguana Restaurant, on November 28, 2015. The dedication ceremony featured a mariachi band, as well as speeches followed by dinner and drinks for guests.

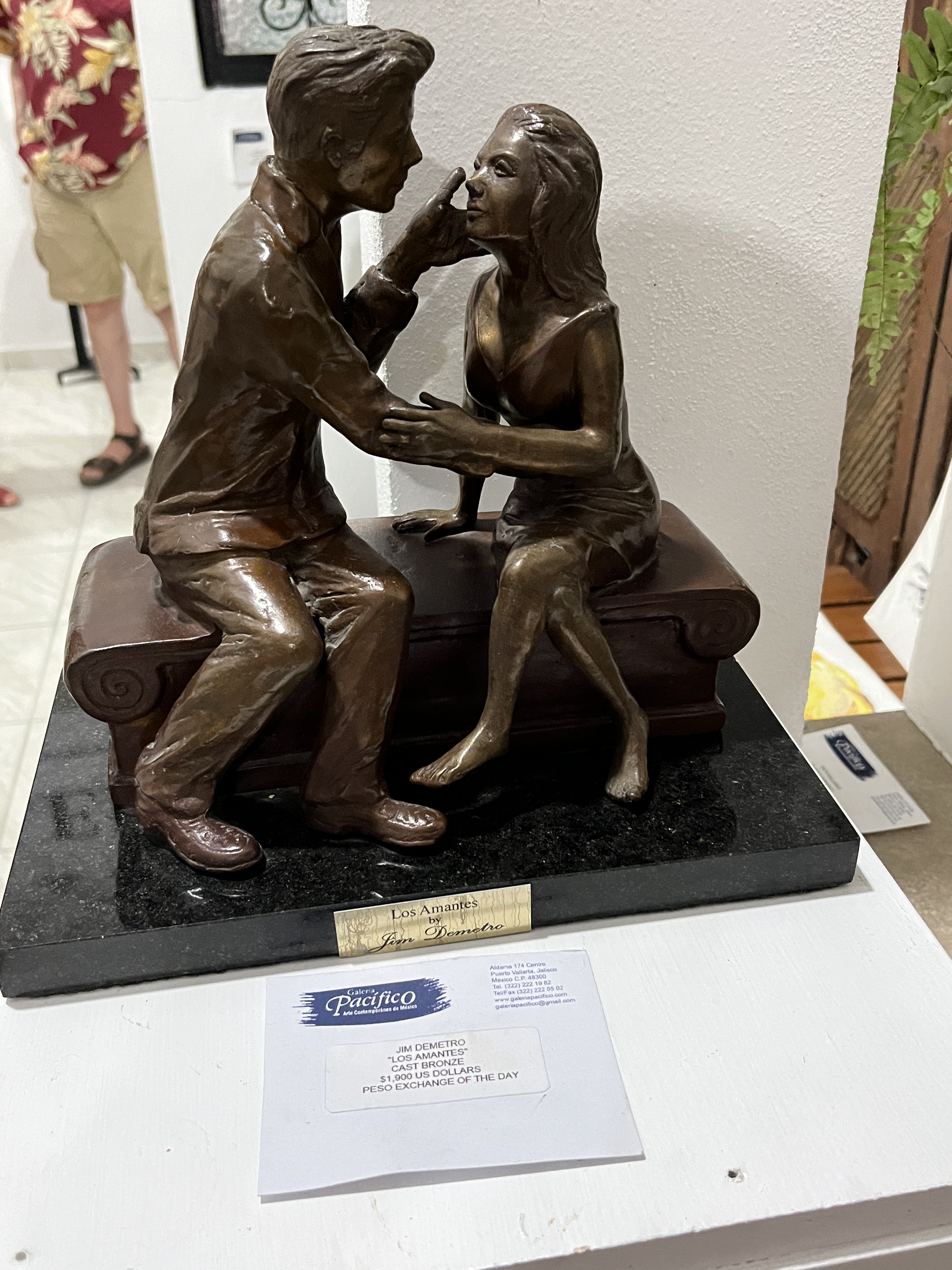
Los Amantes

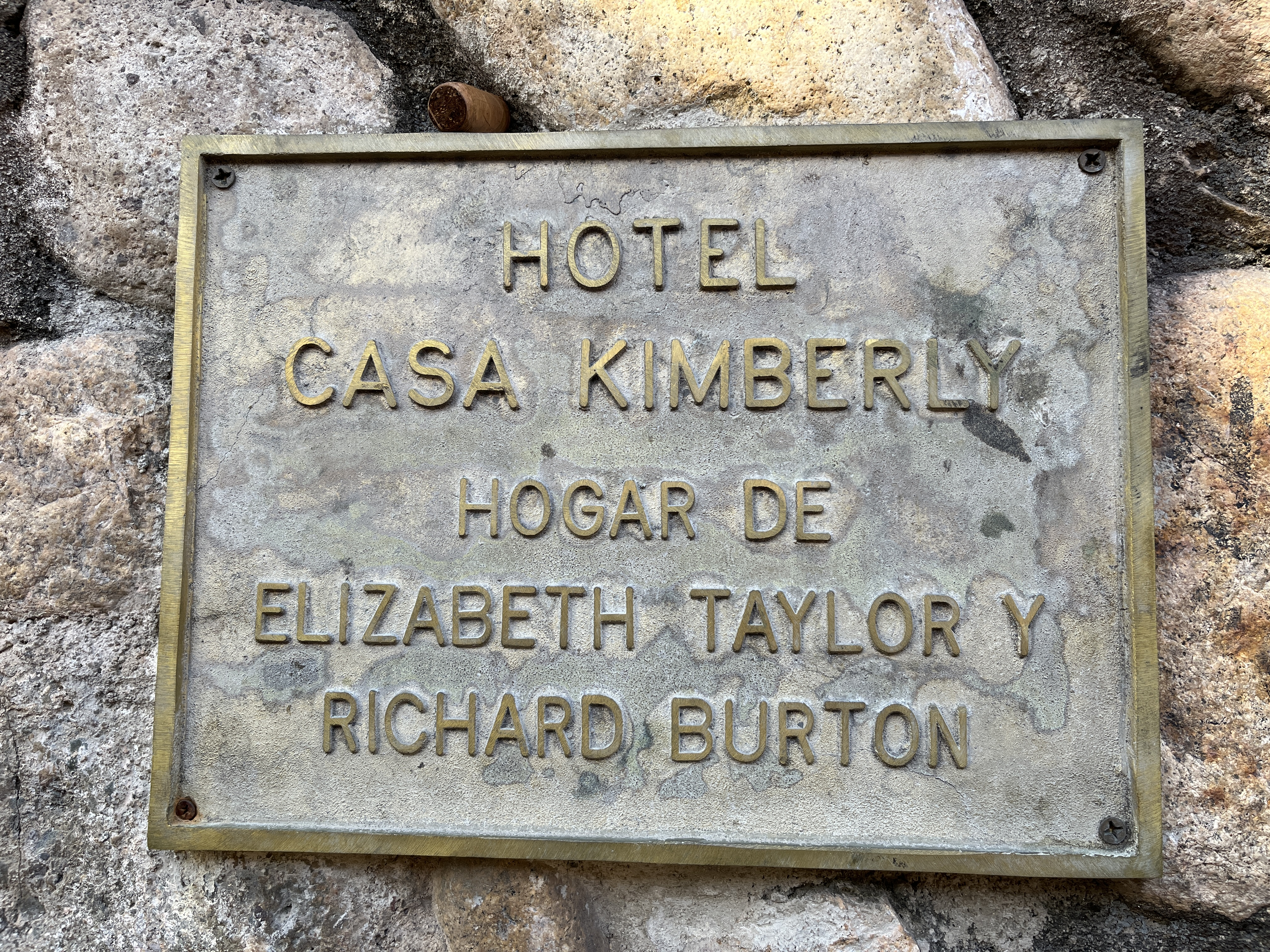
Plaque

== See also ==
- 2015 in art
- Redwood statue of Elizabeth Taylor
