= Los Arcos (Puerto Vallarta) =

Amphitheater in Puerto Vallarta, Jalisco, Mexico

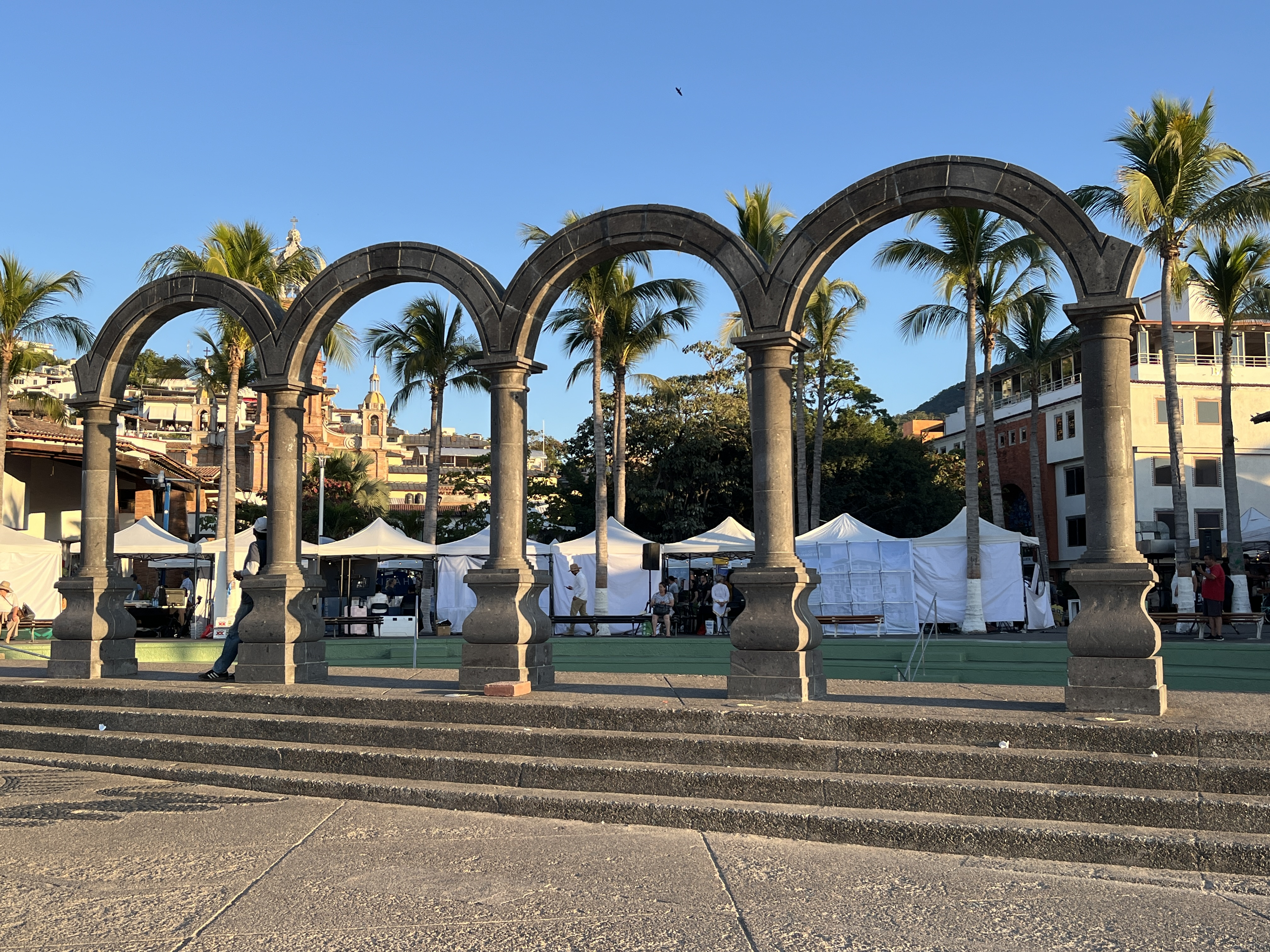
- The arches in 2025

- Location within Mexico
- Coordinates: 20°36′32″N 105°14′10″W

Los Arcos (English: The Arches) is an amphitheater along the Malecón in Centro, Puerto Vallarta, in the Mexican state of Jalisco. Free shows, music festivals and folk dance performances are held there. It is also used for political events.

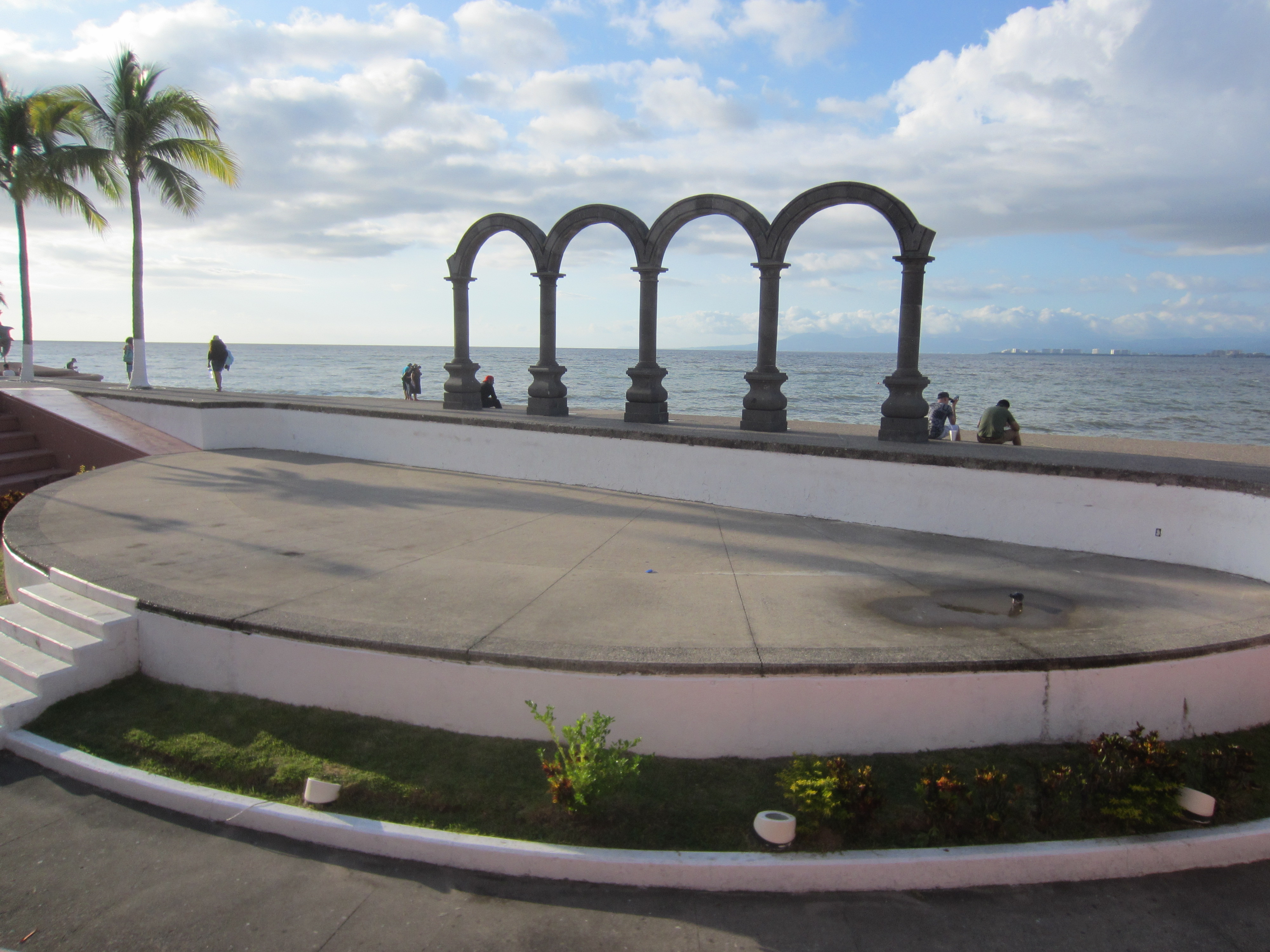
The stage of the amphitheater

The focal point are four decorative stone arches, sometimes called Los Arcos del Malecón (English: Arches of the Malecón), which have been described as "almost as worldwide recognizable" as The Boy on the Seahorse. Brought from a hacienda on the outskirts of the city of Guadalajara in 1970, on the occasion of a summit between the presidents of Mexico and the United States (Gustavo Díaz Ordaz and Richard Nixon, respectively), they were destroyed in 2002 by Hurricane Kenna. A replica was donated by the municipal government of Zapopan, who ordered its reconstruction to the sculptor Martín Distancia. The reconstruction was completed in December 2002.
