= Hotel Rosita =

Hotel in Puerto Vallarta, Jalisco, Mexico

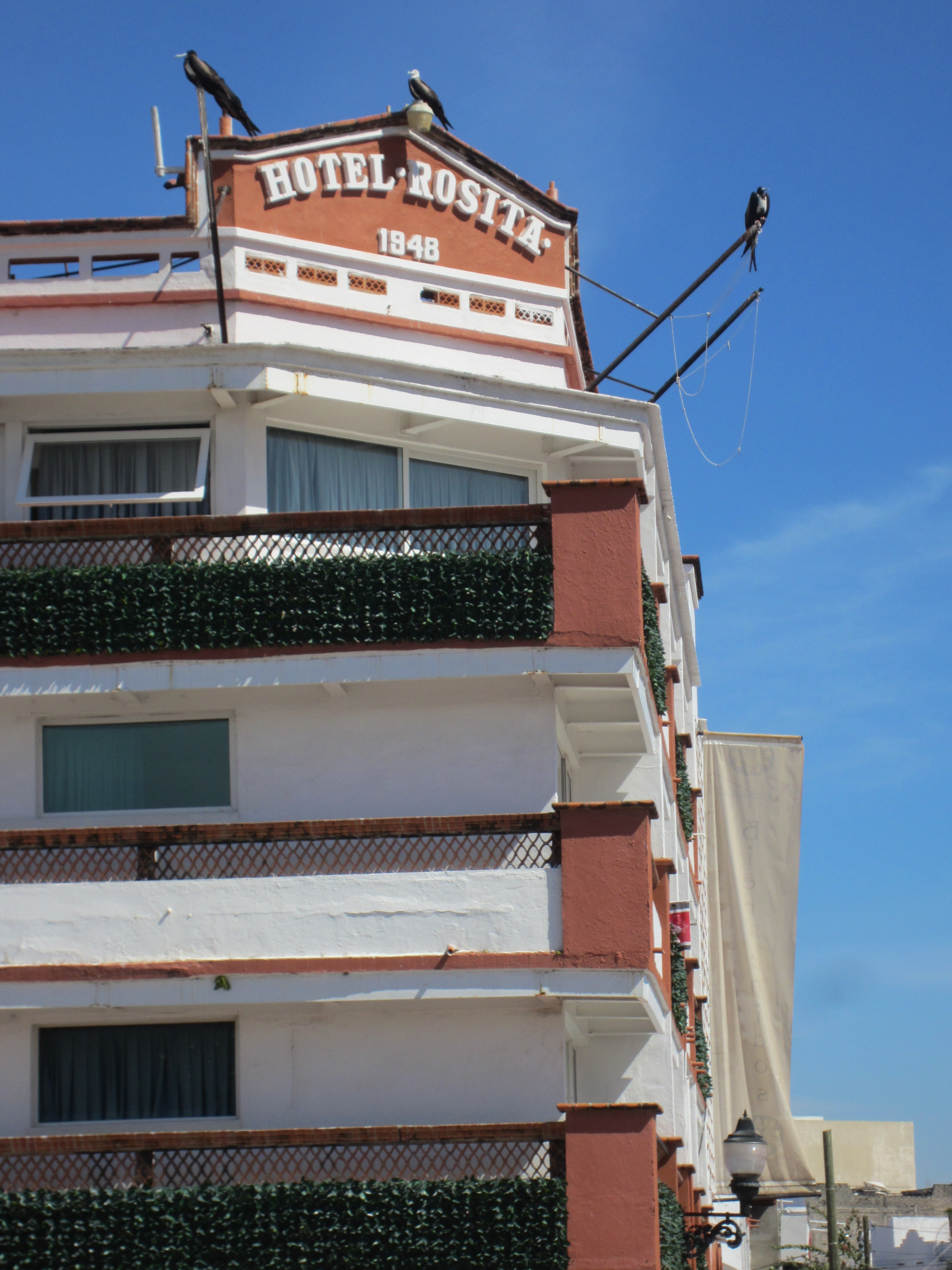
- The hotel's exterior in 2014
- Interactive map of the Hotel Rosita area

General information
- Location: Puerto Vallarta, Jalisco, Mexico
- Coordinates: 20°36′53″N 105°13′58″W
- Completed: 1948

Hotel Rosita is a historic hotel in 5 de Diciembre, Puerto Vallarta, in the Mexican state of Jalisco. The 115-room hotel is among the city's oldest, built in 1948. According to Fodor's, "It's still a viable budget option, mainly recommended for its location on the north end of the malecón close to restaurants and shops. Rooms are very basic; expect white-tile floors and fabrics with floral prints. The cheapest quarters have no air-conditioning."
