= Huevos a la mexicana =

- Type: Scrambled eggs
- Place of origin: Mexico
- Associated cuisine: Mexican
- Main ingredients: Eggs, tomato, onion, chili

Huevos a la mexicana is a dish in Mexican cuisine. It combines scrambled eggs with tomato, onion, and chili. Its name refers to the color of the ingredients, reminiscent of the colors of the flag of Mexico.
