= Church of Our Lady of Guadalupe (Puerto Vallarta) =

Catholic church in Mexico

- Iglesia de Nuestra Señora de Guadalupe
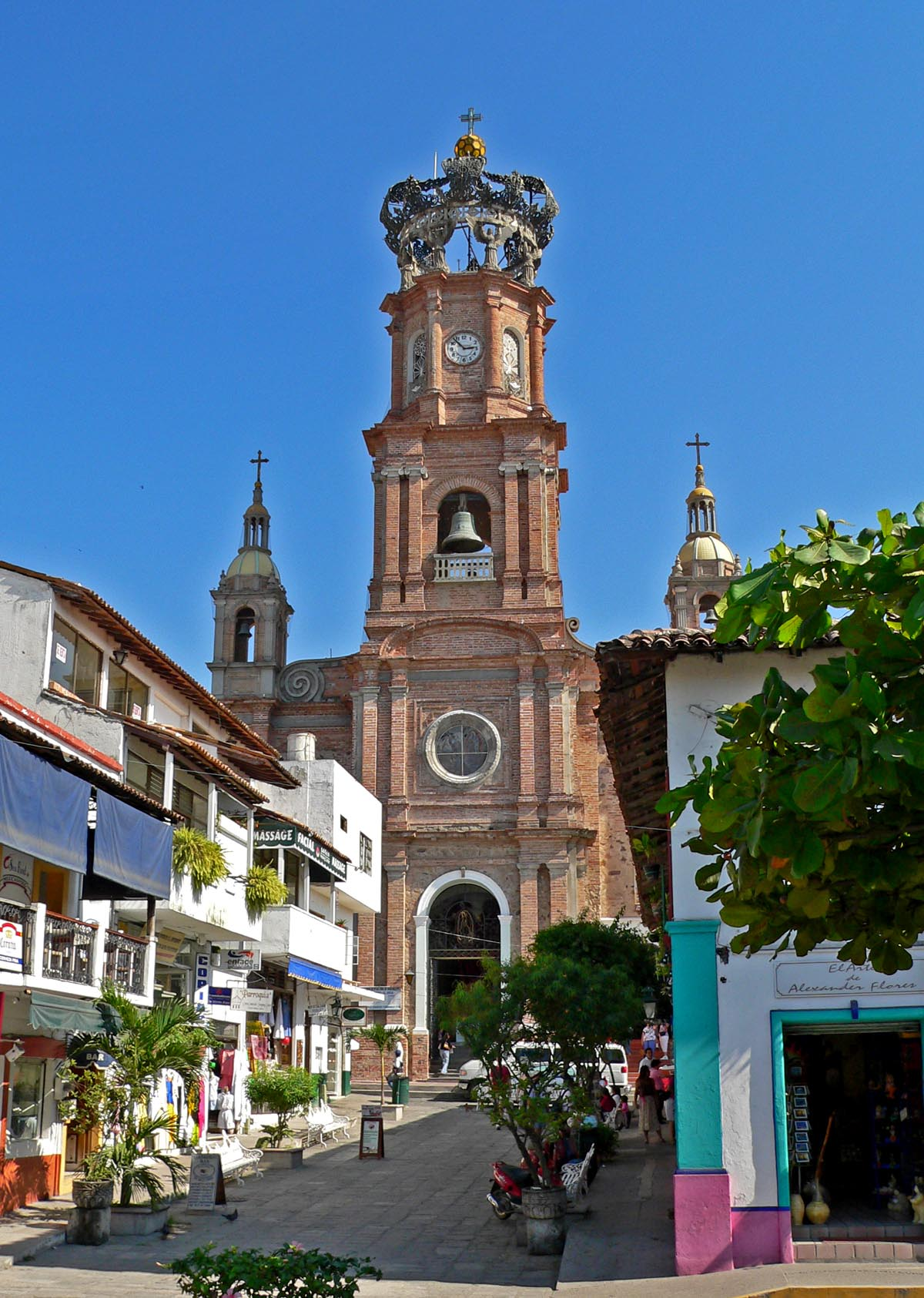
- The church in 2005
- Church of Our Lady of Guadalupe
- 20°36′30″N 105°14′5″W
- Location: Puerto Vallarta
- Country: Mexico
- Denomination: Catholic

History
- Dedication: Our Lady of Guadalupe

Architecture
- Groundbreaking: 1930
- Completed: 1940

The Church of Our Lady of Guadalupe, known locally as the Iglesia de Nuestra Señora de Guadalupe, is a Catholic place of worship in Puerto Vallarta on the Pacific Coast of Mexico. It is open daily, with services in English available on Saturdays and mass in both Spanish and English on Sundays. The Church, built between 1930 and 1940, was constructed on the original foundations of a chapel initially dedicated to Lady Guadalupe in 1901. The Church is dedicated to Our Lady of Guadalupe, also known as the Virgin Mary. She is the patroness saint of Mexico and is considered a religious symbol of Catholic faith and female empowerment. Her feast day on 12 December is also the date of her first apparition. To celebrate this festival (fiesta), many individuals in the Mexican community display altars in their homes consisting of a painting of Our Lady of Guadalupe surrounded by flowers, candles, and other individual touches. During this time, members of many churches, including the church in Puerto Vallarta, light fireworks after the evening rosary leading up to 12 December, the day in 1531 that La Virgen de Guadalupe had her first interaction with a Mexican man named Juan Diego, which essentially established Catholicism in Mexico. She is depicted as a dark-skinned woman whose dialect is Nahuatl, which is Juan Diego's native language. Originally classified as a symbol of religion and faith, her significance in current times surpasses her role in Catholicism. Today, some see her as a figure of Mexican patriotism and liberation.

== Location ==
Mexico is the third largest country in Latin America after Brazil and Argentina. The country is ethnically and regionally diverse, with socioeconomic divisions between each region. Mexico is a nation characterised by extremes of affluence and poverty, with few citizens classified as middle class. There is no official religion in Mexico due to the separation between church and state, however, more than 80% of individuals identify as Roman Catholic. The Church of Our Lady of Guadalupe known locally as the Iglesia de Nuestra Señora de Guadalupe, is located in Puerto Vallarta, a resort town on the Pacific coast of Mexico in the state of Jalisco. Originally commended as a place of culture and sanctity, Puerto Vallarta has transformed into a tourist region and a place for recreation. Puerto Vallarta is known as a vibrant place of celebration and festivities as well as its beaches, marine life and resorts.

== History ==
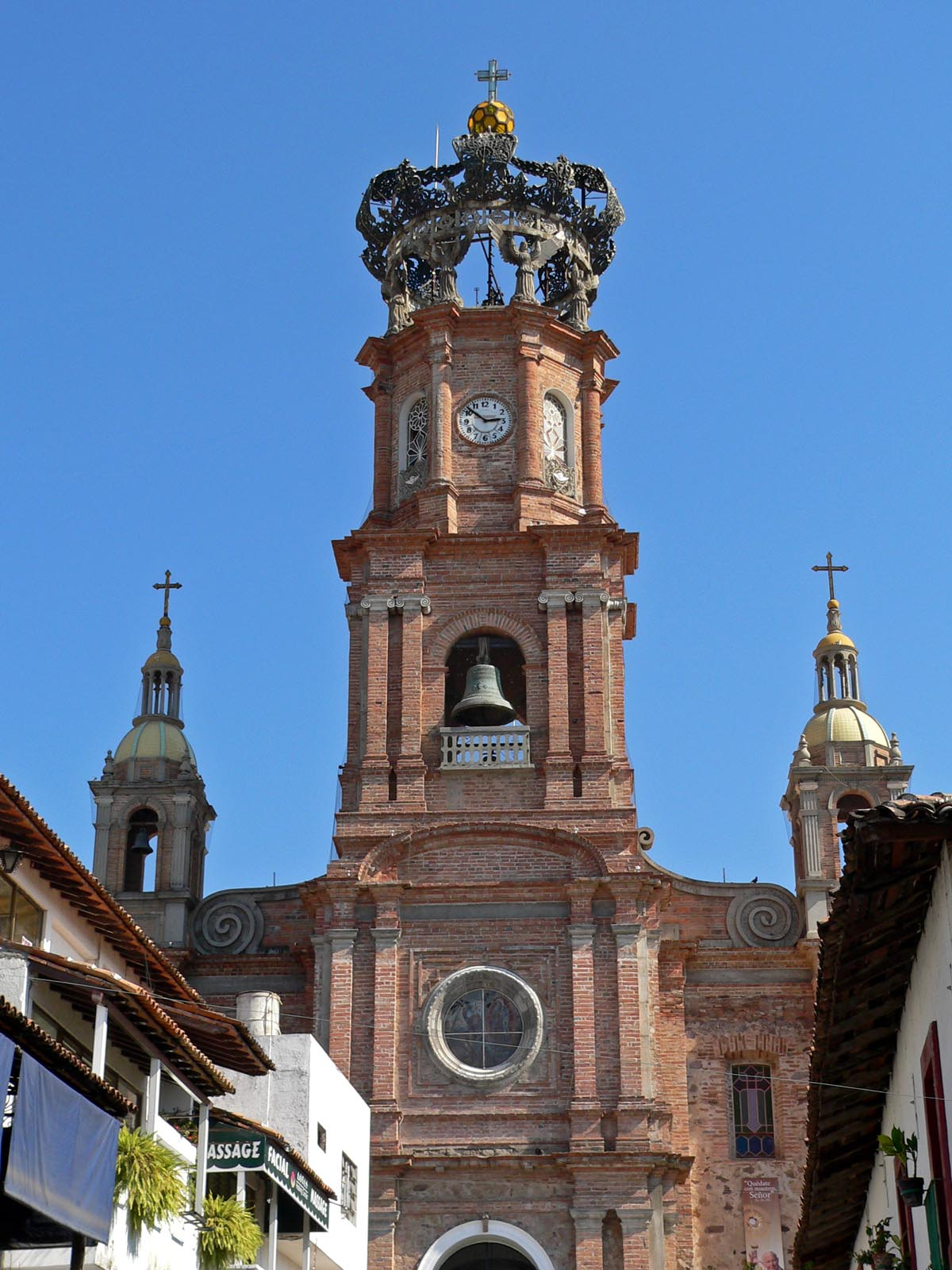
The Church of Our Lady of Guadalupe in Puerto Vallarta

The history of Our Lady of Guadalupe and ultimately Catholicism in North America surrounds the origin story of the Guadalupian Event that took place in December 1531. Juan Diego, an indigenous Mexican man was 57 years old when he encountered and interacted with La Virgen de Guadalupe. He has been labelled the "Messenger of Hope". This occurrence took place on Tepeyac, a hill to the north of today's Mexico City where the Basilica of Our Lady of Guadalupe is located. According to tradition, this interaction took place on a winter's day in 1531 as Juan Diego was crossing the hill. Lady Guadalupe initially asked Juan Diego to build a house (casita) on the hill. He reported this twice to the local bishop who asked him for proof. It was then the lady appeared again to Juan Diego and asked him to collect flowers—"a strange request because flowers were not in season in December". He found an array of Castilian roses and assembled them into a cloak (tilma) which he returned to the bishop as evidence. The legend says that as he presented the cloak to the bishop, it fell to the ground and they saw an image of La Virgen de Guadalupe she had left imprinted on it. Juan Diego did not hesitate to spread the news of his encounter with the "Holy Mary of Guadalupe" and became a missionary known variously as "the humble and obedient Indigenous", "Our Lady's Visionary" and "The humble Ambassador of the Virgin". It is through the sharing of Juan Diego's encounter that Christianity was introduced and spread in Mexico.

== Saints ==
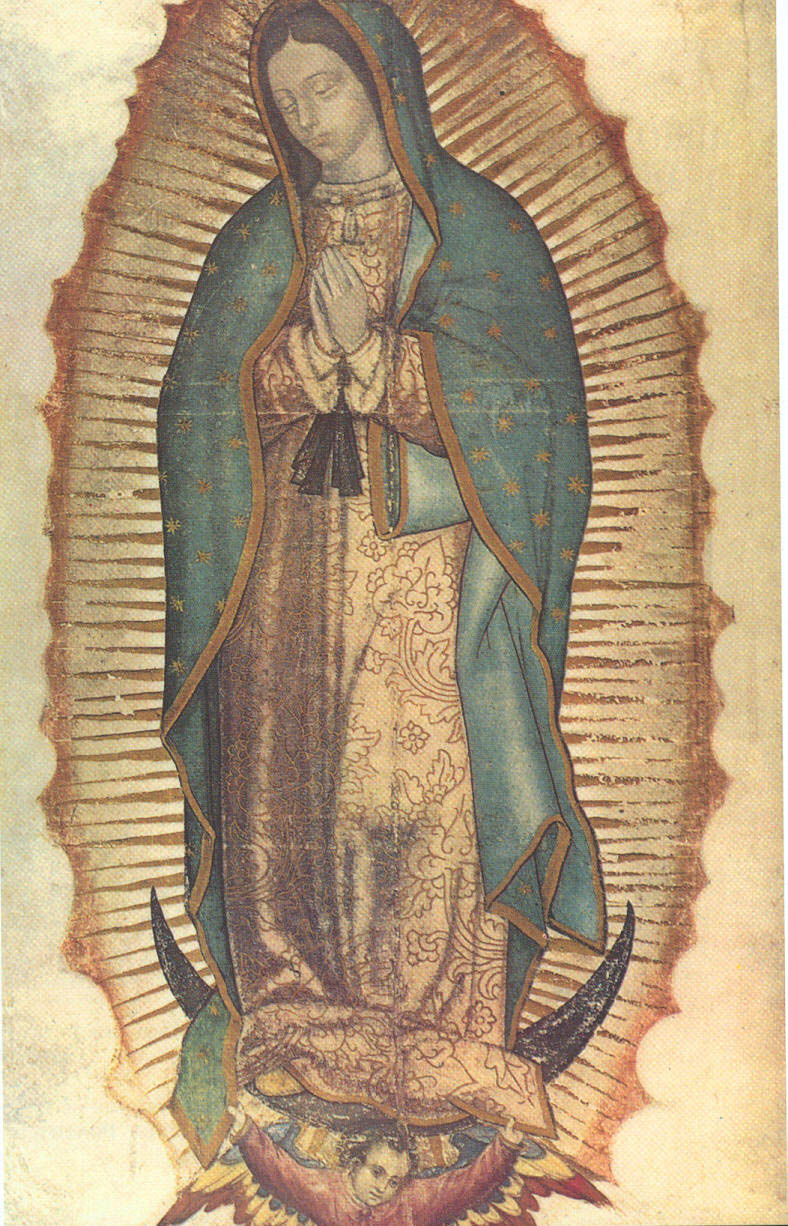
Portrait image of Our Lady of Guadalupe.

The Church of Our Lady of Guadalupe in Puerto Vallarta is a Catholic place of worship dedicated to the patroness saint of Mexico, Our Lady of Guadalupe. A patron saint is the designated protector of a society, church or place and is venerated as an intercessor before God. Pope Pious XII acclaimed our Lady of Guadalupe "Empress of the Americas" in 1945 and she is a symbol of Mexican culture and its liberation. According to Mexican religious tradition she is the mother of God and humanity. It is through her interaction with Juan Diego that Catholicism began in Mexico, providing a new era of religious belief whose roots lay in the Aztec polytheistic culture and belief in the Aztec mother goddess Tonantzin. It was in the sixteenth century that the growth of the cult of Our Lady of Guadalupe began, and the creation of poems and sermons honouring her, and the first artistic interpretations of her image were created expressing a new cultural idiom for Mexico. Her feast day lies on 12 December and is a commemoration of the date in 1531 that she first appeared to Juan Diego. Our Lady of Guadalupe offered a different style of devotion, "She didn't say, go to church or say the rosary" instead she proclaimed that if followers "love me, trust me and believe in me" she will respond.

== Art and architecture ==
=== Art ===
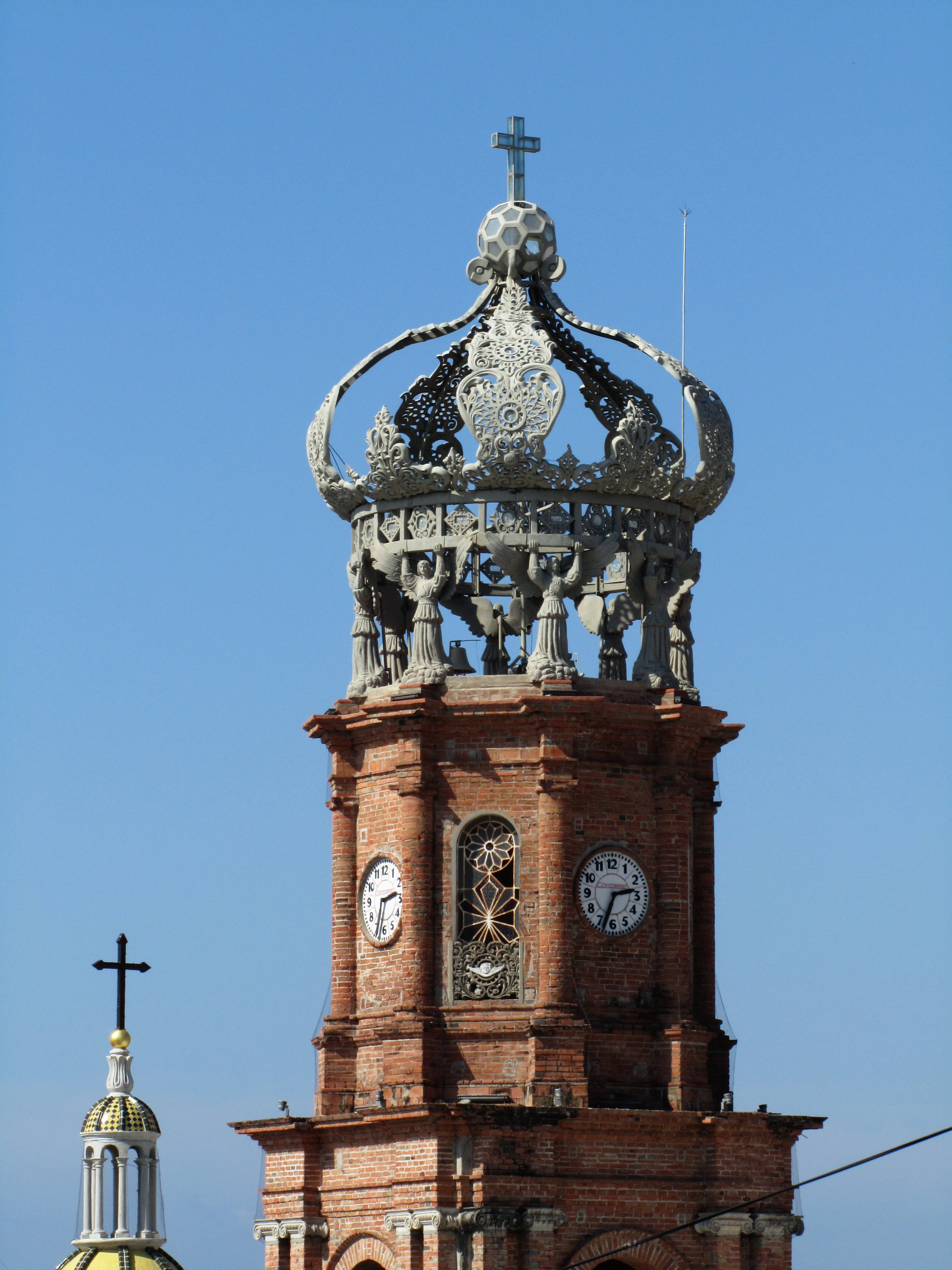
The Crown of The Church of Our Lady of Guadalupe pillar

The first image of Our Lady of Guadalupe dates back to the origins of her interaction with Juan Diego, when her image was miraculously discovered underneath a coat. In traditional paintings, artworks and tapestries, she is depicted as a dark-skinned woman atop a crescent moon with angels at her feet. Baltasar de Echave is the painter of Virgin of Guadalupe (1606), the oldest signed and dated artwork of the patroness saint. Other artists have painted copies of Virgin of Guadalupe, such as Nicolás Enríquez's painting in 1773 which is the most widely venerated sacred image in New Spain. The original tilma that with the image of the virgin still exists and is in the Basilica of Our Lady of Guadalupe in Mexico City on Tepeyak Hill. In the Puerto Vallarta church, there is a replica image of Our Lady of Guadalupe that people revere, painted by Ignacio Ramirez in 1945, this oil painting is in the church's forefront above the altar.

=== Architecture ===
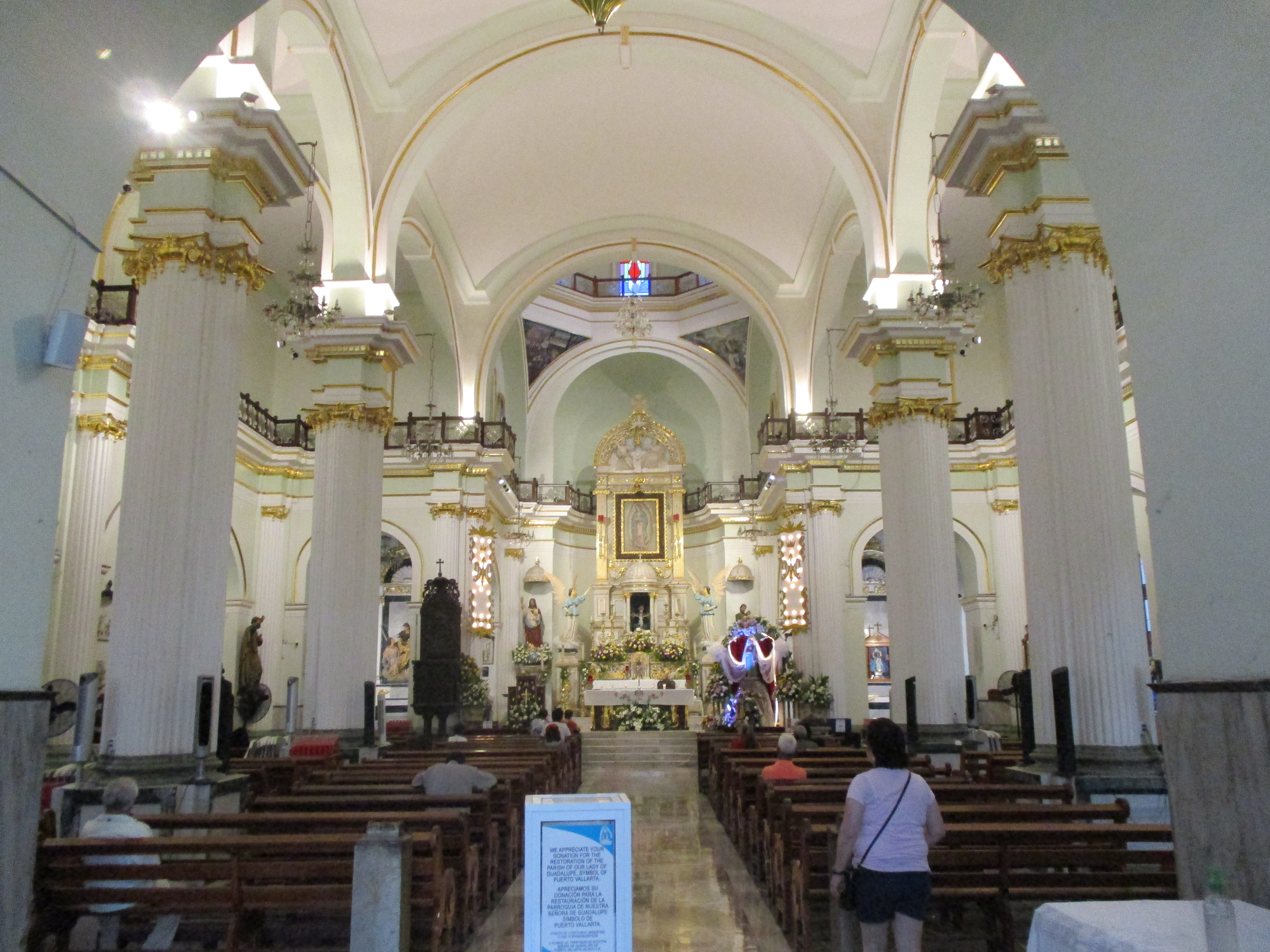
The Sanctuary space inside the Church of Our Lady of Guadalupe

The Church of Our Lady of Guadalupe (Puerto Vallarta) is in the centre of the town square. It was built between 1930 and 1940. The church is not based on a sophisticated design but is an encapsulation of the parish priest's ideas and the rustic townscape of the past. The church has a neoclassical structure, and the crown seated above the main building is indicative of baroque style European temples. The original church crown eroded because of weather and was restored in 1981, however, in 1995 it was damaged by a strong earthquake and replaced with a temporary fibre glass structure. In 2009, Carlos Terres, a Jaliscan artist, sculptured and rebuilt a replacement for the crown. The church's towers reflect the renaissance age. In parish documents, Father Luis Ramirez refers to the Church as, "an expression of village art, which symbolises the authentic urban look of Puerto Vallarta".

== Celebrations ==
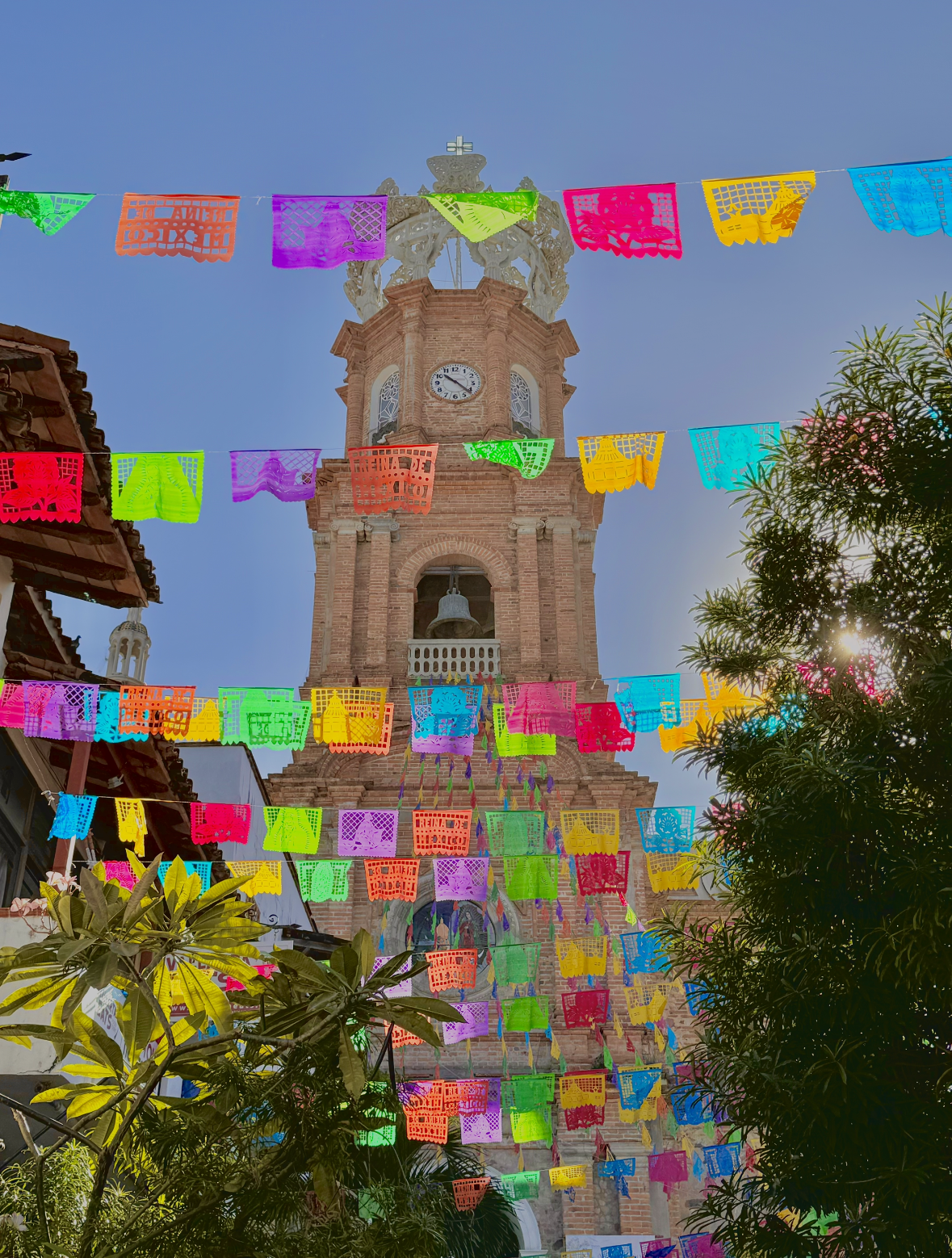
Church of Our Lady of Guadalupe in Puerto Vallarta with celebratory decorations for a festival.

The most prominent celebration is that of Our Lady of Guadalupe. This is a fiesta held on the 12 December to commemorate the first apparition of her sighted by Juan Diego. It has been celebrated on this date every year for the past 400 years. Many churches, including The Church of Our Lady of Guadalupe in Puerto Vallarta, celebrate the event by setting off fireworks after the evening rosary usually for 10 days leading up to 12 December. Depending on the specific district there are towns that organise parades and or processions that follow altars of Lady Guadalupe carried by the faithful and include children who dress either as Juan Diego or the Virgin Mary. In Puerto Vallarta, the celebration trails down the cobblestone street from Juarez Street to the Church of Our Lady of Guadalupe. Businesses, food stands, families and religious unions form a line that occupies the celebratory laneway. There are commonly mariachi bands and traditional dancers involved in the festivities. To celebrate this event, Mexican homeowners will usually create a shrine in honour of the patroness saint, covering and surrounding the memorial with flowers, candles, individual torches and other trinkets. Catholic Christian citizens usually awake before sunrise on 12 December to sing of the virgin in local churches and cathedrals. This is followed by a communal feast of traditional Mexican meals such as atole and prozole which is a corn-based drink and a pork and hominy stew, both customary meals consumed on her feast day. This day is considered a yearly opportunity for Mexican citizens both, religious and non-religious, to celebrate their culture and faith.

== Significance ==
Our Lady of Guadalupe has also been perceived as a symbol of Mexican female liberation and power, and has simultaneously been heavily associated with feminist theology. Feminist theology promotes equality between men and women, the creation of peace and implementation of justice in religion. She has often been considered a symbol of maternity, female empowerment and social justice and has been celebrated by women not only in Mexico but in other places of Latin America and the United States.

The Spanish Conquest of the Aztec Empire was not only a revolt and a conquest of people, but it was simultaneously a conquest of women, captured by force and used for gift exchange and or trade. For Mexican-American women today, Our Lady of Guadalupe remains a symbol of dignity and an affirmation of those lives who are questioned. Moreover, the Spanish Conquest of the Aztec Empire was not only a time for military defense but also the overrule of old traditions, rituals and gods that were considered pagan. To the indigenous people, Our Lady of Guadalupe is more than a symbol of life and hope, she provides them with hope of salvation. Depicted as a virgin, she encapsulates feminist and maternal attributes and remains a powerful symbol of motherhood, feminism and social justice. Today, Lady Guadalupe who was originally a symbol of Catholicism, has surpassed religious ties and it is intertwined with the culture and civilization of Mexico. Extending beyond the confines of Mexico, in the United States she has been utilized as an icon of social justice appeals to those in society who lack power. She stands for life, health and hope and is considered not only a supernatural mother but also a natural mother who symbolizes both political and religious aspirations. Ultimately, Our Lady of Guadalupe is a collective representation of Mexican society and reflects the emotions and relationships of Mexican life.

== See also ==
- List of churches under the patronage of Our Lady of Guadalupe
- Roman Catholic Marian Churches
