= The Amazing Race 36 =

Season of television series

- Season 36
- Promotional poster
- Presented by: Phil Keoghan
- No. of teams: 13
- Winners: Ricky Rotandi & Cesar Aldrete
- No. of legs: 11
- Distance traveled: 11,711 mi (18,847 km)
- No. of episodes: 10

Release
- Original network: CBS
- Original release: March 13 – May 15, 2024

Additional information
- Filming dates: October 25 – November 17, 2022

Series chronology
- ← Previous; Season 35 Next → Season 37

The Amazing Race 36 is the thirty-sixth season of the American reality competition show The Amazing Race. Hosted by Phil Keoghan, it featured thirteen teams of two, each with a pre-existing relationship, competing in a race around the Americas to win US$1,000,000. This season visited two continents and eight countries and traveled over 11,711 miles (18,847 km) during 11 legs. Starting in Puerto Vallarta, racers traveled through Mexico, Colombia, Chile, Argentina, Uruguay, Barbados, and the Dominican Republic before returning to the United States and finishing in Philadelphia. Filmed during the waning days of the COVID-19 pandemic global health emergency and prior to the 35th aired season, this season features chartered air travel rather than commercial air travel and other accommodations for the safety of the racers. The season premiered on CBS on March 13, 2024, and concluded on May 15, 2024.

Boyfriends Ricky Rotandi and César Aldrete were the winners of this season, while military pilots Juan Villa and Shane Bilek finished in second place, and married couple Rod and Leticia Gardner finished in third place.

== Format ==
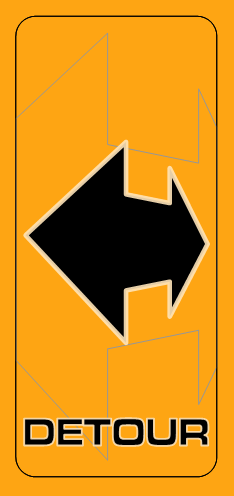
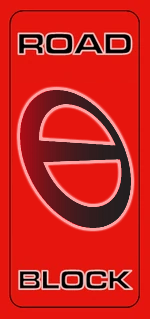
The clues which contestants receive during the course of the race generally fall into three categories: Route Info, Detour, and Roadblock.

The Amazing Race is a reality television show created by Bertram van Munster and Elise Doganieri, and hosted by Phil Keoghan. The series follows teams of two competing in a race around the world. Each leg of the race requires teams to deduce clues, navigate foreign environments, interact with locals, perform physical and mental challenges, and travel on a limited budget provided by the show. At each stop during the leg, teams receive clues inside sealed envelopes, which fall into one of these categories:

- Route Info: These are simple instructions that teams must follow before they can receive their next clue.
- Detour: A Detour is a choice between two tasks. Teams may choose either task and switch tasks if they find one option too difficult. There is usually one Detour present on each leg.
- Roadblock: A Roadblock is a task that only one team member can complete. Teams must choose which member will complete the task based on a brief clue they receive before fully learning the details of the task. There is usually one Roadblock present on each leg.

Most teams who arrive last at the Pit Stop of each leg are progressively eliminated, while the first team to arrive at the finish line in the final episode wins the grand prize of US$1,000,000.

== Contestants ==
The cast of thirteen teams includes former NFL wide receiver Rod Gardner and his wife Leticia, who were revealed early on February 6, 2024, in the lead-up to Super Bowl LVIII. The remaining twelve teams were revealed on February 21, 2024.

Contestants	Age	Relationship	Hometown	Status
Maya Mody	19	Siblings	Monmouth Junction, New Jersey	Eliminated 1st (in Puerto Vallarta, Mexico)
Rohan Mody	22	Siblings	Monmouth Junction, New Jersey	Eliminated 1st (in Puerto Vallarta, Mexico)
Chris Foster	60	Father & Daughter	Waltham, Massachusetts	Eliminated 2nd (in Puerto Vallarta, Mexico)
Mary Cardona-Foster	27	Father & Daughter	Waltham, Massachusetts	Eliminated 2nd (in Puerto Vallarta, Mexico)
Anthony Smith	26	Twins	Clearwater, Florida	Eliminated 3rd (in El Peñol, Colombia)
Bailey Smith	26	Twins	Clearwater, Florida	Eliminated 3rd (in El Peñol, Colombia)
Michelle Clark	39	Married Aerobics Instructors	East Point, Georgia	Eliminated 4th (in Medellín, Colombia)
Sean Clark	46	Married Aerobics Instructors	East Point, Georgia	Eliminated 4th (in Medellín, Colombia)
Kishori Turner	26	Cousins	Gaithersburg, Maryland	Eliminated 5th (in Santiago, Chile)
Karishma Cordero	22	Cousins	Austin, Texas	Eliminated 5th (in Santiago, Chile)
Derek Williams	57	Grandparents	Alta Loma, California	Eliminated 6th (in Córdoba, Argentina)
Shelisa Williams	55	Grandparents	Alta Loma, California	Eliminated 6th (in Córdoba, Argentina)
Sunny Pulver	41	Firefighter Moms	Edgerton, Wisconsin	Eliminated 7th (in Montevideo, Uruguay)
Bizzy Smith	37	Firefighter Moms	New Berlin, Wisconsin	Eliminated 7th (in Montevideo, Uruguay)
Angie Butler	55	Mother & Son	Walla Walla, Washington	Eliminated 8th (in Christ Church, Barbados)
Danny Butler	27	Mother & Son	San Diego, California	Eliminated 8th (in Christ Church, Barbados)
Yvonne Chavez	40	Girlfriends	San Diego, California	Eliminated 9th (in Puerto Plata, Dominican Republic)
Melissa Main	38	Girlfriends	San Diego, California	Eliminated 9th (in Puerto Plata, Dominican Republic)
Amber Craven	30	Dating Nurses	Englewood, Colorado	Eliminated 10th (in La Boca, Dominican Republic)
Vinny Cagungun	37	Dating Nurses	Englewood, Colorado	Eliminated 10th (in La Boca, Dominican Republic)
Rod Gardner	46	Married	Lawrenceville, Georgia	Third place
Leticia Gardner	38	Married	Lawrenceville, Georgia	Third place
Juan Villa	29	Military Pilots	Spokane, Washington	Runners-up
Shane Bilek	29	Military Pilots	Marine City, Michigan	Runners-up
Ricky Rotandi	34	Boyfriends	New York City, New York	Winners
Cesar Aldrete	34	Boyfriends	New York City, New York	Winners

Future appearances

Michelle and Sean Clark appeared on Wife Swap: Real Housewives Edition in 2025. In 2026, Ricky Rotandi competed on the sixth season of The Floor.

== Contestant progress ==
The following teams are listed with their placements in each leg. Placements are listed in finishing order.

- A red placement with a dagger (†) indicates that the team was eliminated.
- An italicized placement indicates a team's placement at the midpoint of a Mega Leg.

Team placement (by leg)
Team	1	2	3	4	5	6a (Note: This was a Mega Leg with two Roadblocks and two Detours. The placements listed for the first half are the order of the teams' completion of the first Roadblock in Córdoba.)	6b	7	8	9	10	11
Ricky & Cesar	2nd	2nd	1st	1st	1st	2nd	2nd	1st	1st	1st	3rd	1st
Juan & Shane	4th	4th	4th	5th	2nd	1st	1st	6th	2nd	3rd	2nd	2nd
Rod & Leticia	1st	1st	5th	4th	5th	5th	3rd	3rd	5th	2nd	1st	3rd
Amber & Vinny	12th	7th	2nd	2nd	3rd	3rd	4th	4th	3rd	4th	4th†	
Yvonne & Melissa	6th	5th	6th	7th	6th	6th	6th	5th	4th	5th†		
Angie & Danny	7th	6th	9th	3rd	4th	4th	5th	2nd	6th†			
Sunny & Bizzy	9th	9th	7th	8th	7th	7th	7th	7th†				
Derek & Shelisa	3rd	3rd	3rd	6th	8th	8th	8th†					
Kishori & Karishma	10th	10th	8th	9th	9th†							
Michelle & Sean	5th	11th	10th	10th†								
Anthony & Bailey	8th	8th	11th†									
Chris & Mary	11th	12th†										
Maya & Rohan	13th†											

== Race summary ==
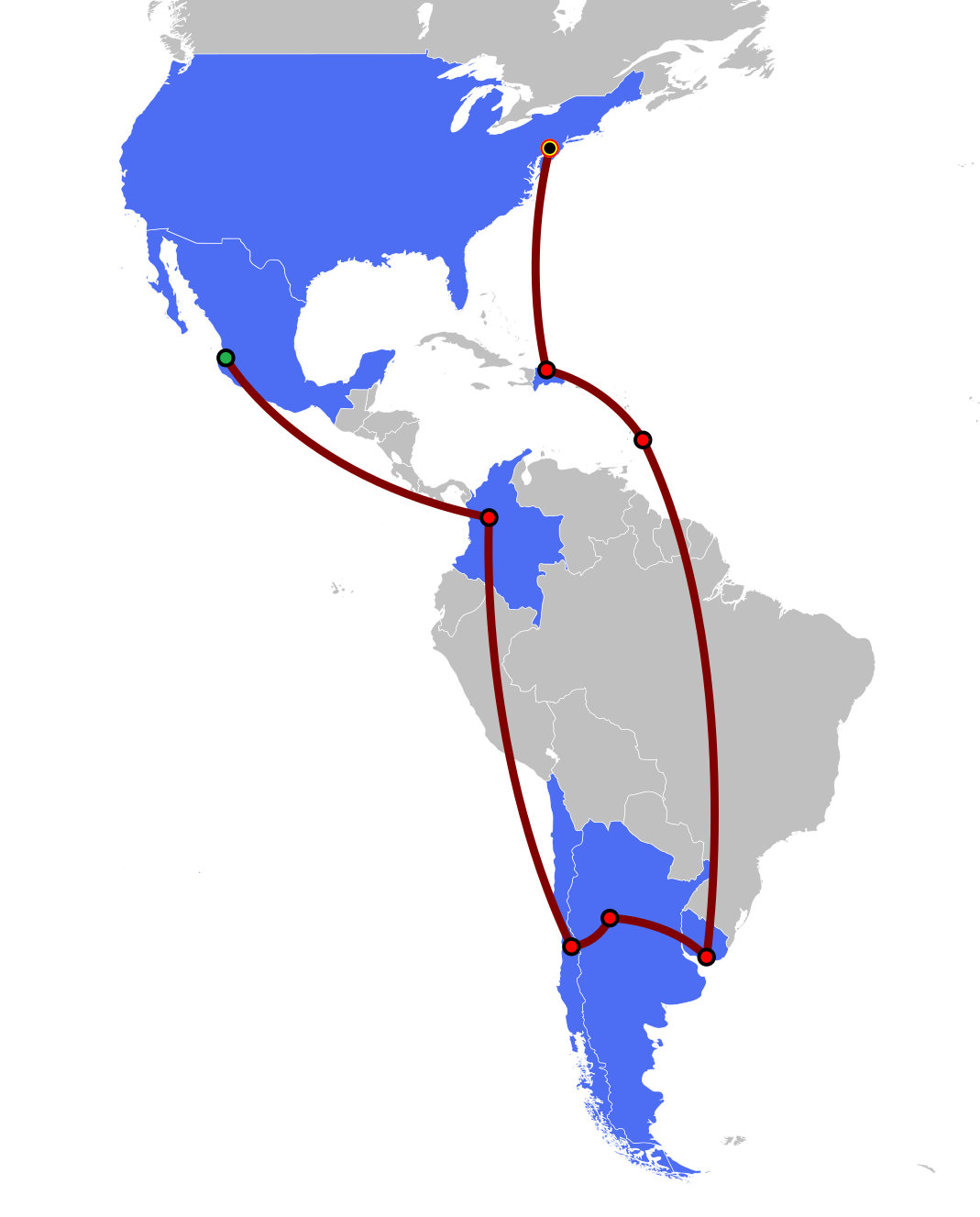
The route of The Amazing Race 36.

Destinations	Air travel Rail travel Water travel Bus travel Helicopter travel Bicycle travel Gondola travel
Route Markers	Detour Roadblock Pit Stop

=== Leg 1 (Mexico) ===
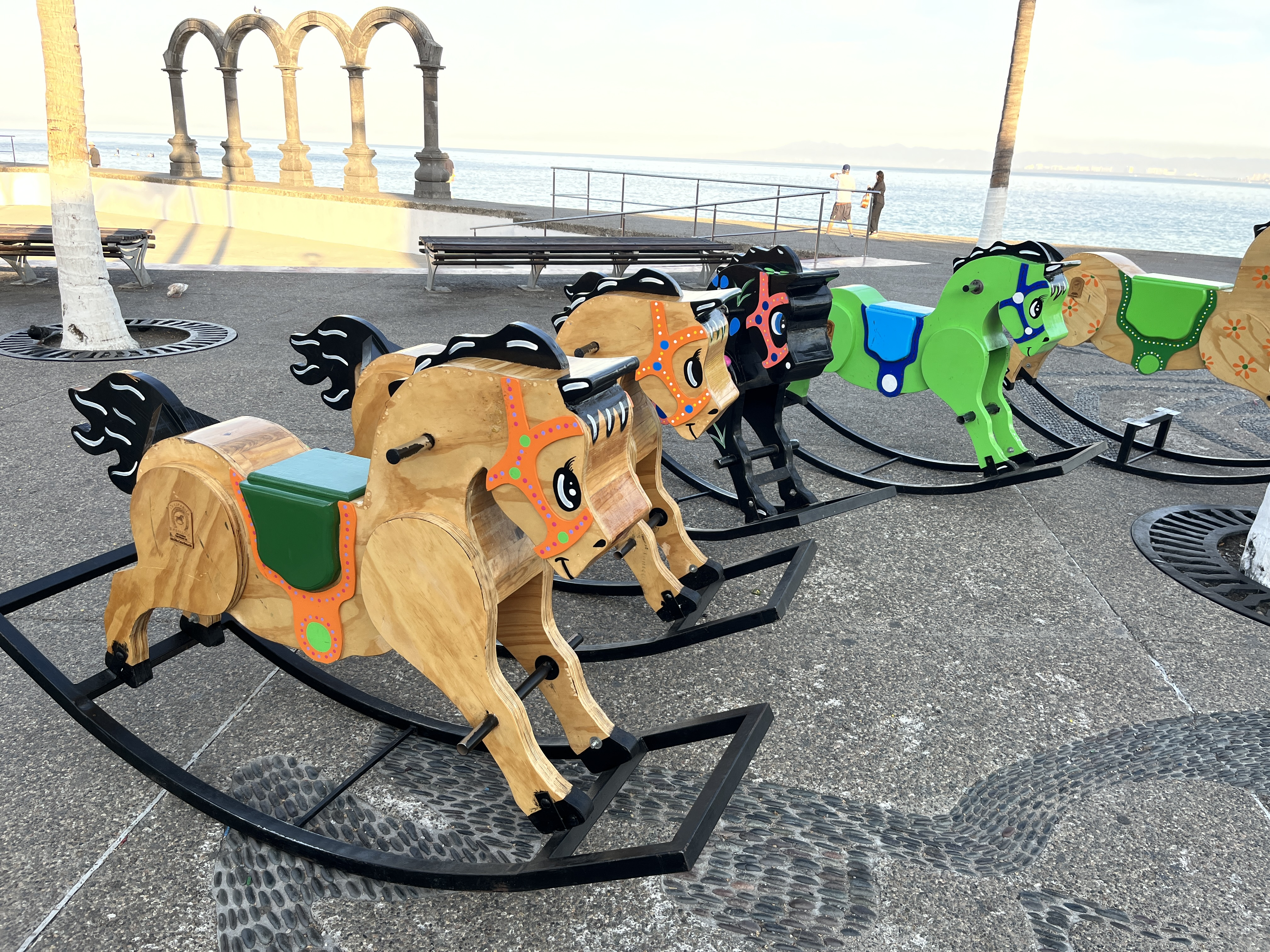
In Puerto Vallarta, teams had to deliver rocking horses for one Detour option and visit Los Arcos.

- Episode 1: "You Can't Drive While You're Crying" (March 13, 2024)
- Eliminated: Maya & Rohan

Locations

- Puerto Vallarta, Mexico (The Westin Resort & Spa – Playa El Salado) (Starting Line)
- Puerto Vallarta (Malecón – Voladores Pole)
- Puerto Vallarta (Calle Corona 408 & In Search of Reason or Plaza Hidalgo)
- Puerto Vallarta (Lienzo Charro Miguel "Prieto" Ibarria)
- Puerto Vallarta (Plaza de Los Arcos del Malecón)

Episode summary

- Teams set off from Playa El Salado in Puerto Vallarta, Mexico, and had to search the hotel parking lot for a car with their first clue. Teams then had to drive to the Malecón and find their next clue by the voladores pole.
- This season's first Detour was a choice between Pick 'Em Up or Pin 'Em Down. In Pick 'Em Up, teams had to transport a pair of rocking horses down a steep hill to the sculpture In Search of Reason in order to receive their next clue. In Pin 'Em Down, teams had to watch a Mexican-style professional wrestling match and then pair up the masks of five fighting duos in order to receive their next clue.
- After the Detour, teams had to drive to the Lienzo Charro Miguel "Prieto" Ibarria, which had their next clue.
- In this season's first Roadblock, one team member had to complete a charro challenge by jumping through seven spinning lassos in order to receive their next clue, which directed them to the Pit Stop: the Plaza de Los Arcos del Malecón.

Additional note

- Although the last team to arrive at the Pit Stop was eliminated, there was no rest period at the end of the leg and all remaining teams were instead instructed to continue racing.

=== Leg 2 (Mexico) ===
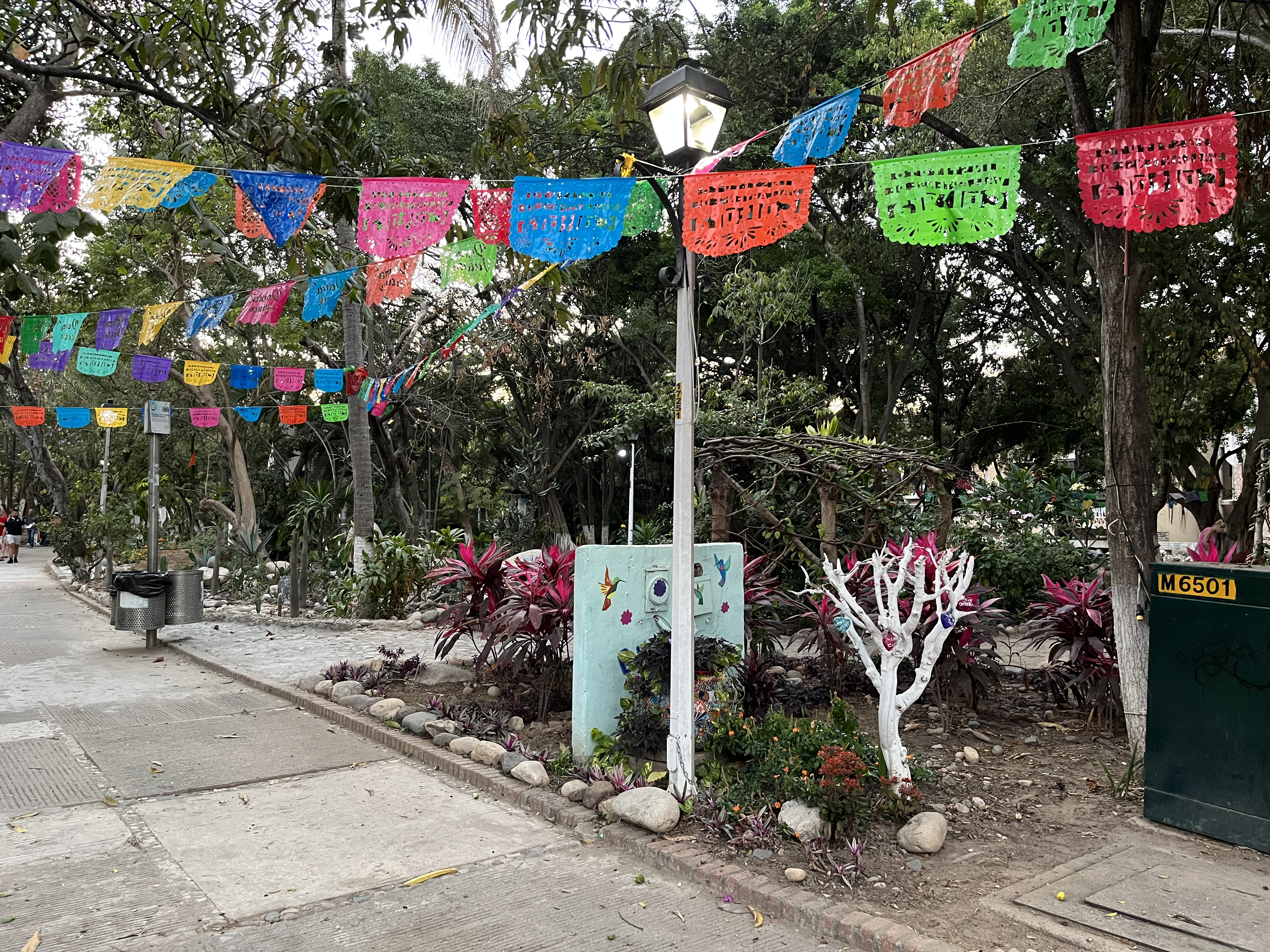
One of the Detour choices on Isla Cuale required teams to search among numerous strings of papel picado for one with an incorrect color pattern.

- Episode 2: "Trust But Verify" (March 20, 2024)
- Prize: Cashback rewards for a trip for two to Lisbon, Portugal (awarded to Rod & Leticia)
- Eliminated: Chris & Mary

Locations

- Puerto Vallarta (La Iguana Bridge)
- Puerto Vallarta (Isla Cuale)
- Puerto Vallarta (Lázaro Cárdenas Park)
- Puerto Vallarta (Casa Kimberly)

Episode summary

- At the start of this leg, teams were instructed to travel on foot to their next clue at La Iguana Bridge.
- This leg's Detour was a choice between Balloon Collection or Color Correction. In Balloon Collection, teams had to obtain six balloon bunches and exchange them for their next clue. In Color Correction, teams had to search among numerous strings of papel picado for one with an incorrect color pattern in order to receive their next clue.
- After the Detour, teams found their next clue at Lázaro Cárdenas Park.
- In this leg's Roadblock, one team member had to paint a Day of the Dead calavera design onto their partner's face in order to receive their next clue.
- After the Roadblock, teams had to don monarch butterfly wings and travel on foot to "the bridge that connects Elizabeth Taylor and Richard Burton's houses" in order to find the Pit Stop: the Casa Kimberly.

=== Leg 3 (Mexico → Colombia) ===
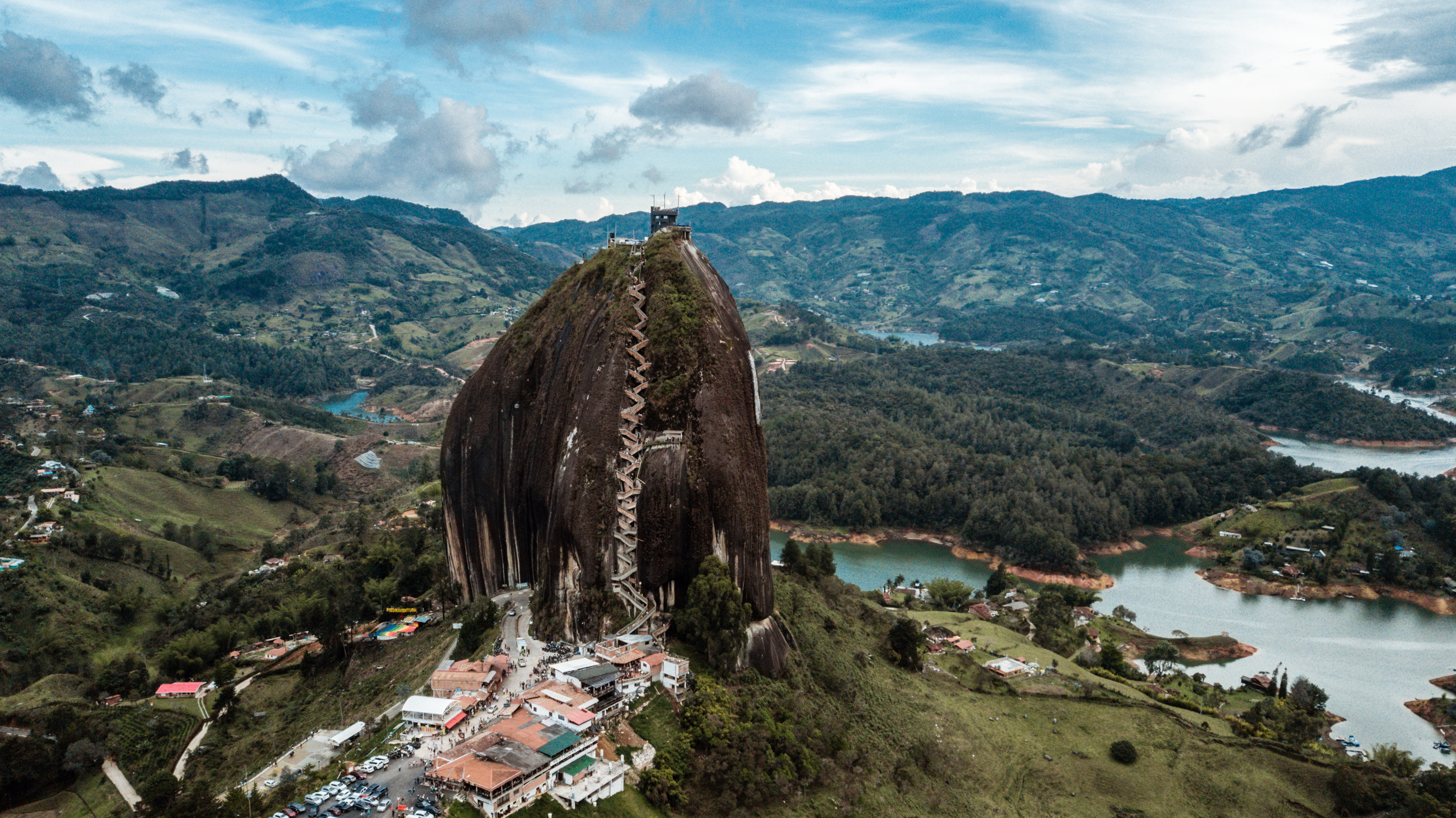
Once in Guatapé, teams had to climb over 700 stairs to the top of El Peñón de Guatapé.

- Episode 3: "It's Not Over Til Phil Sings" (March 27, 2024)
- Prize: Cashback rewards for a trip for two to Cape Town, South Africa (awarded to Ricky & Cesar)
- Eliminated: Anthony & Bailey

Locations

- Puerto Vallarta → Medellín, Colombia
- Guatapé (El Peñón de Guatapé)
- Guatapé (Calle 29 or Parqueadero Municipal)
- Guatapé (El Cordero de Guatapé)
- El Peñol (Casa Loma)
- El Peñol (Casa Loma – Finca Cafetera)

Episode summary

- During the Pit Stop, teams were flown to Medellín, Colombia, and traveled to Guatapé. Teams departed in groups 15 minutes apart based on the order of their arrival at the previous Pit Stop and had to climb to their next clue atop El Peñón de Guatapé.
- This leg's Detour was a choice between Bandeja Paisa or Yipao. Teams first had to travel by water taxi into town. In Bandeja Paisa, teams had to prepare three plates of bandeja paisa in order to receive their next clue. In Yipao, teams had to load a Willys Jeep with furniture, much like during a Yipao parade, in order to receive their next clue.
- After the Detour, teams had to travel to El Cordero de Guatapé and then travel by tuk-tuk to Casa Loma, where they found their next clue.
- In this leg's Roadblock, one team member had to harvest and process one kilogram of ripe Arabica beans in order to receive their next clue, which directed teams to the nearby Pit Stop.

=== Leg 4 (Colombia) ===
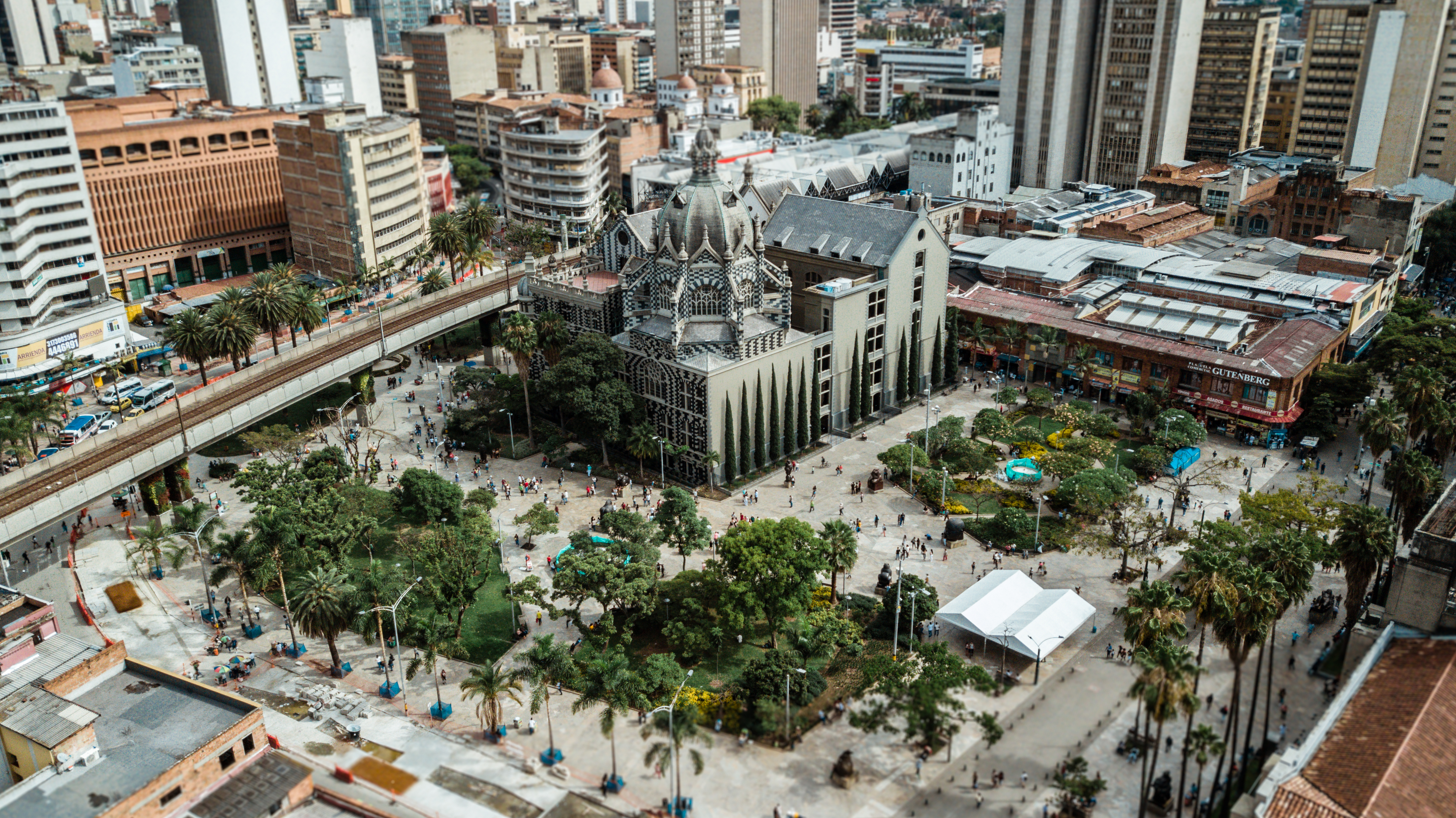
The Roadblock in Downtown Medellín had racers memorize the various sculptures of Fernando Botero scattered around Botero Plaza.

- Episode 4: "Those Who Wander Are Not Lost" (April 3, 2024)
- Prize: US$2,500 each (awarded to Ricky & Cesar)
- Eliminated: Michelle & Sean

Locations

- San Felix (Parapente BlueSky)
- Bello (Mirador La Meseta)
- Medellín (Comuna 13 – Reversadero 1)
- Medellín (Botero Plaza)
- Medellín (Parques del Río Medellín)

Episode summary

- Prior to the start of this leg, teams paraglided into Medellín. Teams then departed from Mirador La Meseta in groups 15 minutes apart based on the order of their arrival at the previous Pit Stop, and had to travel by taxi to their next clue at the escalators in Comuna 13.
- This leg's Detour was a choice between Dance Vibe or Wall Scribe. In Dance Vibe, teams had to perform a 30-second breakdance routine in order to receive their next clue. In Wall Scribe, teams had to solve a rebus puzzle in order to receive their next clue from local artist Chota 13.
- After the Detour, teams found their next clue at Botero Plaza.
- In this leg's Roadblock, one team member had to memorize and post the names of 12 of the plaza's total of 23 sculptures by Colombian artist, Fernando Botero, on a designated map in order to receive their next clue, which directed teams to travel on foot to the Pit Stop: Parques del Río Medellín.

=== Leg 5 (Colombia → Chile) ===
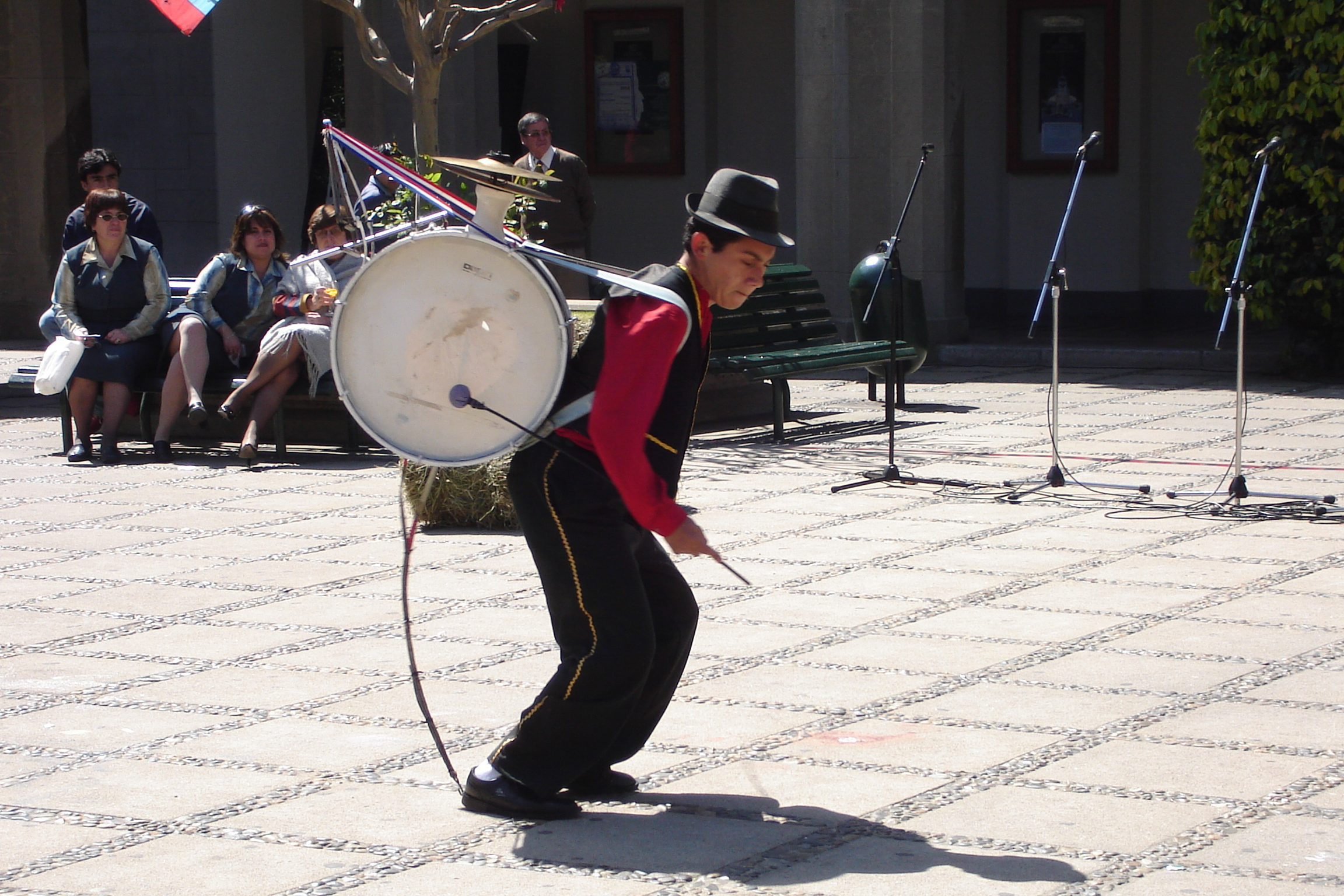
One of the Detour choices in Santiago required one team member to perform as a chinchinero, while the other had to collect donations.

- Episode 5: "Save The Stress For Later" (April 10, 2024)
- Prize: Cashback rewards for a trip for two to Singapore (awarded to Ricky & Cesar)
- Eliminated: Kishori & Karishma

Locations

- Medellín → Santiago, Chile
- Santiago (Plaza de Armas)
- Santiago (Argomedo Performance Garage)
- Santiago (Skatepark Parque Araucano)
- Santiago (Parque Quinta Normal or Parque Escalada Los Silos)
- Santiago (Estación Mapocho)

Episode summary

- During the Pit Stop, teams were flown to Santiago, Chile. Teams departed from Plaza de Armas in groups 15 minutes apart based on the order of their arrival at the previous Pit Stop and had to find Marilyn Monroe's 1956 Ford Thunderbird, which was at the Argomedo Performance Garage, before receiving their next clue. Teams then had to drive to Skatepark Parque Araucano and find their next clue.
- In this leg's Roadblock, one team member had to build a skateboard so that it matched an example in order to receive their next clue.
- This leg's Detour was a choice between Perform for Pesos or Climb for Clues. In Perform for Pesos, one team member had to perform as a chinchinero, a one-man band street performer, while their partner played maracas and collected CLP$2,500 (US$2,60) from passersby in order to receive their next clue. In Climb for Clues, both team members had to climb a six-story former cement factory, retrieve a ribbon, and exchange them for their next clue.
- After the Detour, teams had to drive to the Pit Stop: Estación Mapocho.

=== Leg 6 (Chile → Argentina) ===
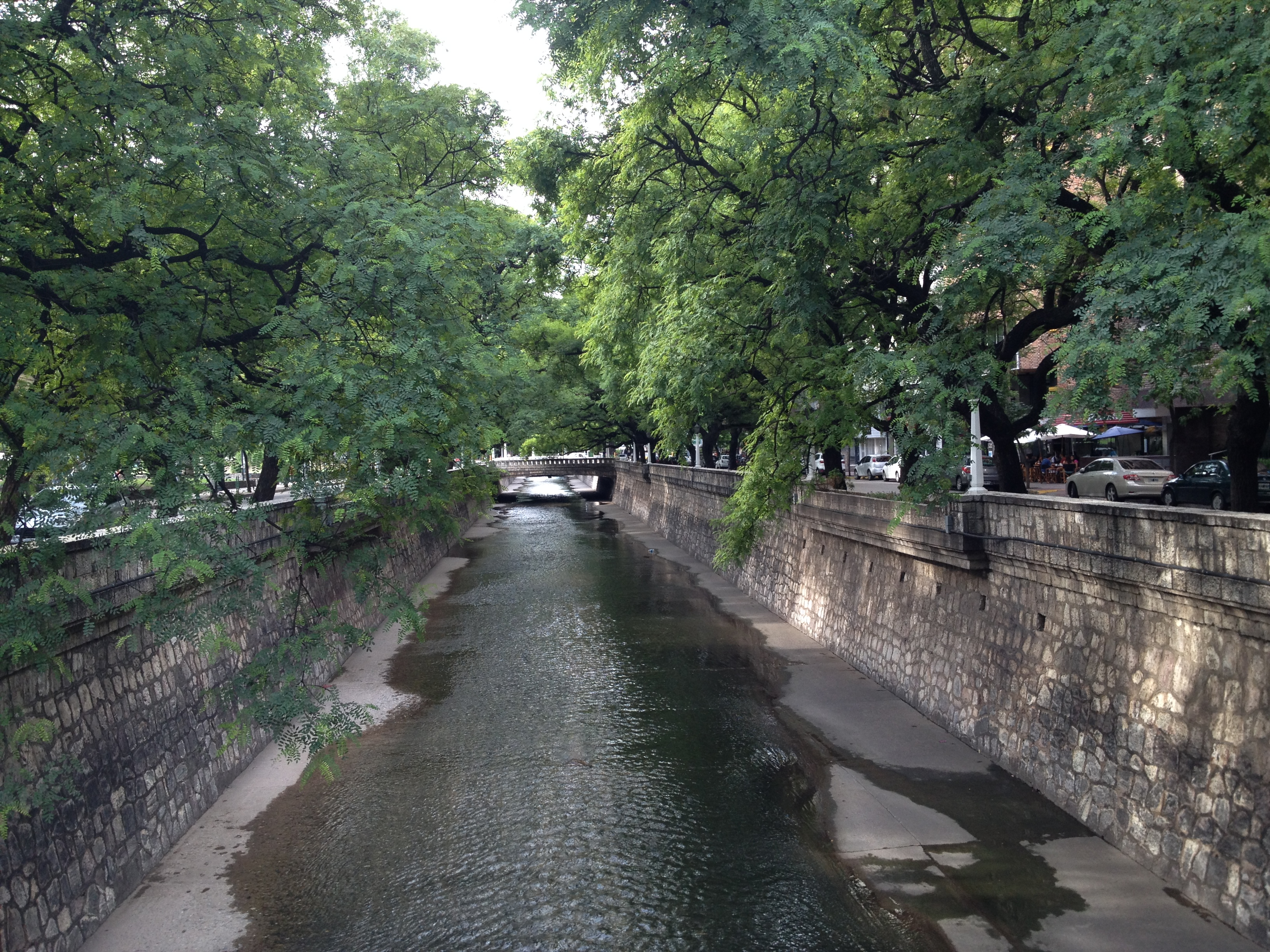
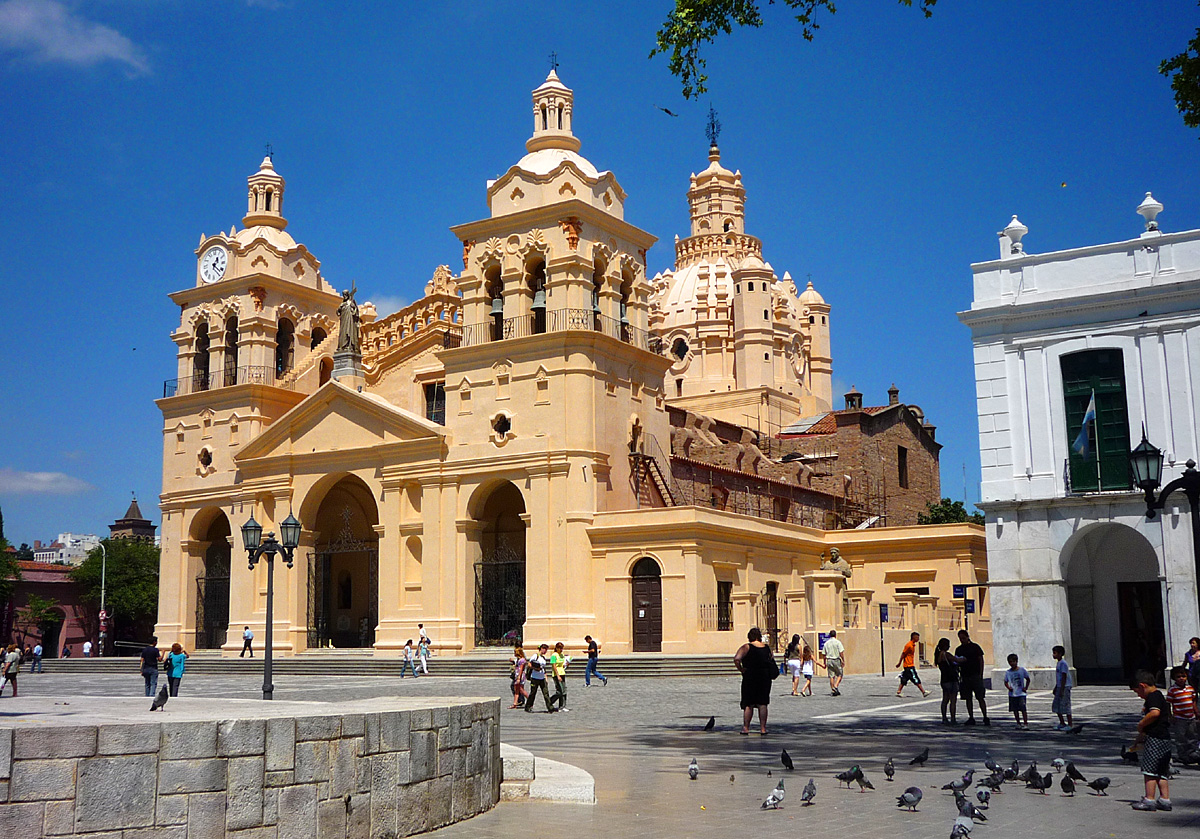
The Mega Leg in Córdoba began at La Cañada and concluded at Plaza San Martín overlooking Cathedral of Córdoba.
- Episode 6: "Our Alliance Strikes Again" (April 17, 2024)
- Prize: US$5,000 each (awarded to Juan & Shane)
- Eliminated: Derek & Shelisa

Locations

- Santiago → Córdoba, Argentina
- Córdoba (La Cañada)
- Córdoba (Plaza del Bicentenario)
- Córdoba (Plaza Ex.Vélez Sársfield or Sarmiento Park)
- Córdoba (Circuito Lobo Race)
- Córdoba (Estadio Francisco Cabasés)
- Córdoba (Mirador del Coniferal – Escaleras Parque Sarmiento)
- Córdoba (Frigorífico "Gral Paz" & Patio de los Naranjos)
- Córdoba (Plaza San Martín)

Episode summary

- During the Pit Stop, teams were flown to Córdoba, Argentina. Teams departed from La Cañada in groups 15 minutes apart based on the order of their arrival at the previous Pit Stop and had to drive to their next clue at Plaza del Bicentenario.
- This leg's first Detour was a choice between Bicicleta or Boleadora. In Bicicleta, teams had to pedal a stationary bicycle with a grinder and grind plastic bottles until they filled a container in order to receive their next clue. In Boleadora, both team members had to throw boleadoras until they could wrap a moving target within ten tosses between the two in order to receive their next clue.
- After the first Detour, teams had to drive to Circuito Lobo Race and find their next clue.
- In this leg's first Roadblock, one team member had to ride in a rally car, memorize the circuit, and assemble a puzzle of the circuit within three minutes in order to receive their next clue.
- After the first Roadblock, teams had to drive to Estadio Francisco Cabasés and find their next clue.
- In this leg's second Roadblock, one team member had to play bubble soccer and score a goal within 90 seconds in order to receive their next clue.
- After the second Roadblock, teams had to drive to Mirador del Coniferal and search the steps of Escaleras Parque Sarmiento for their next clue.
- This leg's second Detour was a choice between Who Did It or What's Your Beef?. In Who Did It, teams had to dust for fingerprints and match the print with its file in order to receive their next clue. In What's Your Beef?, teams had to match 14 cuts of meat with their names in one of three available stations in order to receive their next clue.
- After the second Detour, teams had to check in at the Pit Stop: Plaza San Martín, overlooking the Cathedral of Córdoba

Additional notes

- Leg 6 was a Mega Leg.
- Derek & Shelisa fell so far behind the other teams that they didn't get to the second Detour before all of the other teams had already checked in at the Pit Stop. They were instead instructed to go directly to the Pit Stop for elimination.

=== Leg 7 (Argentina → Uruguay) ===
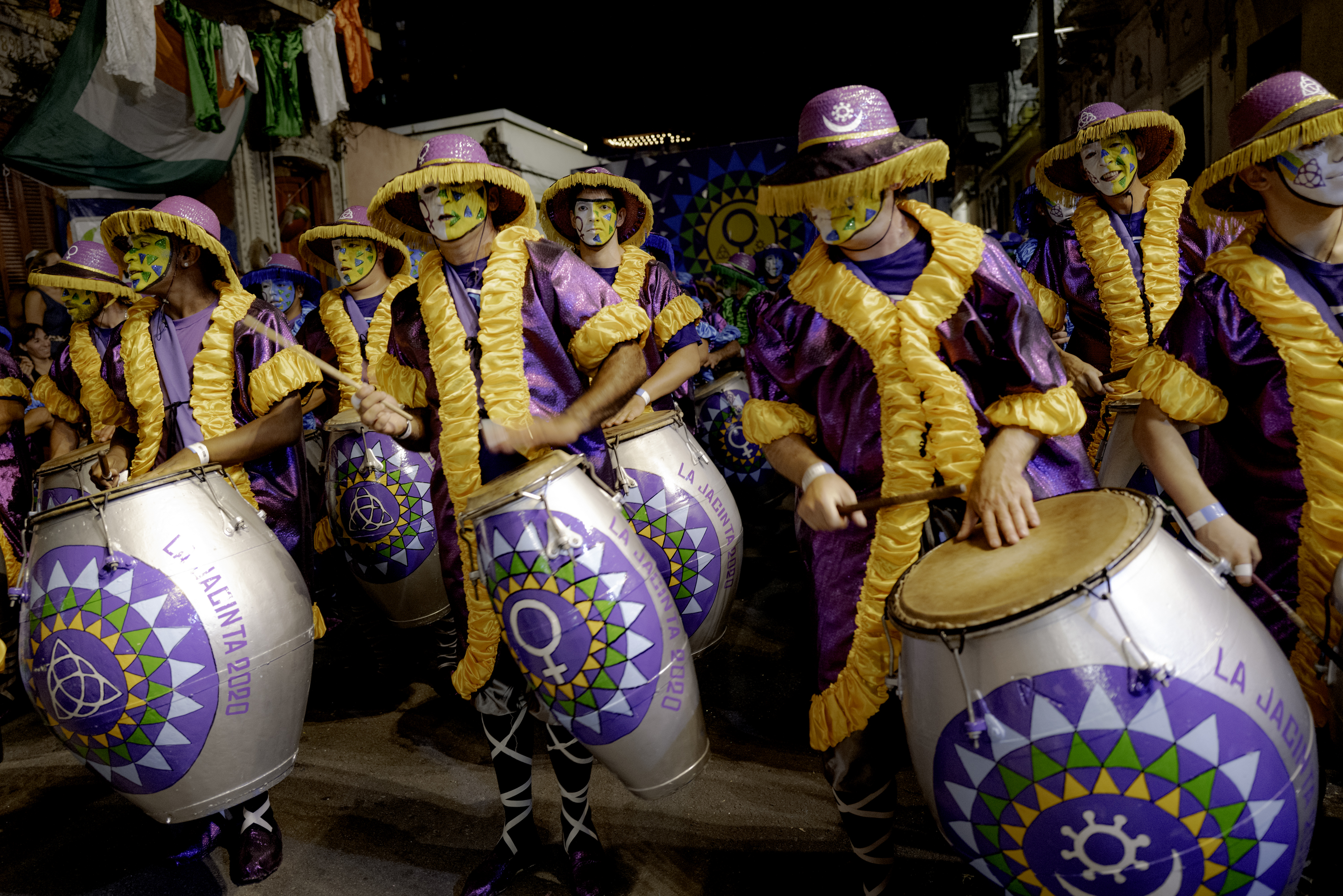
Teams experienced aspects of Uruguayan Carnival while in Montevideo.

- Episode 7: "Walk and Chew Gum Baby" (April 24, 2024)
- Prize: Cashback rewards for a trip for two to Paris, France (awarded to Ricky & Cesar)
- Eliminated: Sunny & Bizzy

Locations

- Córdoba → Montevideo, Uruguay
- Montevideo (Fortaleza del Cerro)
- Montevideo (Puerto Logístico Punta de Sayago)
- Montevideo (Ciudad Vieja – Plaza de la Fuente)
- Montevideo (Calle Isla de Flores or Plaza Juan Ramón Gomez)
- Montevideo (Playa Malvín)

Episode summary

- During the Pit Stop, teams were flown to Montevideo, Uruguay. Teams departed from Fortaleza del Cerro in groups 15 minutes apart based on the order of their arrival at the previous Pit Stop and had to drive to their next clue at Puerto Logístico Punta de Sayago.
- In this leg's Roadblock, one team member had to weld two pieces of metal into a right angle that could withstand two impacts from a hammer in order to receive their next clue.
- After the Roadblock, teams found their next clue at Plaza de la Fuente near Mercado del Puerto inside the old city of Ciudad Vieja.
- This leg's Detour was a choice between Candombe or Murga. In Candombe, teams had to perform a candombe drum routine in order to receive their next clue. In Murga, teams had to sing a murga song in Uruguayan Spanish in order to receive their next clue.
- After the Detour, teams had to drive to the Pit Stop: Playa Malvín.

=== Leg 8 (Uruguay → Barbados) ===
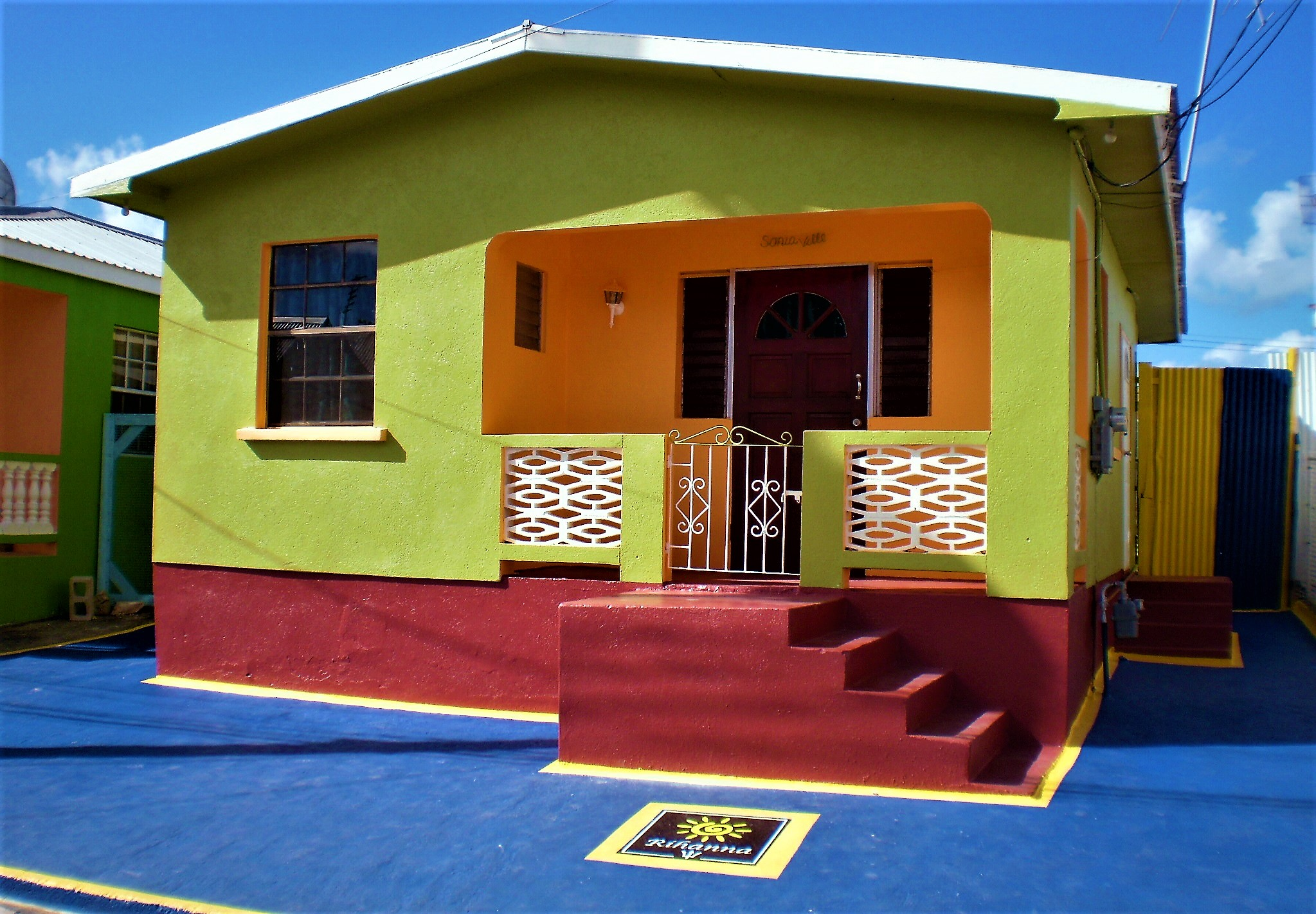
Teams had to find the childhood home of singer Rihanna in Barbados.

- Episode 8: "That's What Being Strong Will Do" (May 1, 2024)
- Prize: US$7,500 each (awarded to Ricky & Cesar)
- Eliminated: Angie & Danny

Locations

- Montevideo → Bridgetown, Barbados
- Bridgetown (Chamberlain Bridge)
- Bridgetown (Fairfield – Intersection of Parkinson Road & Fairfield Road)
- Bridgetown (Rihanna's Childhood Home)
- Christ Church (Long Bay Beach)
- Christ Church (Hastings Rocks)

Episode summary

- During the Pit Stop, teams were flown to Bridgetown, Barbados. Teams departed from the Chamberlain Bridge in groups 15 minutes apart based on the order of their arrival at the previous Pit Stop and had to drive to their next clue in the neighborhood of Fairfield.
- In this leg's Roadblock, one team member had to play road tennis and score eleven points against a local player in order to receive their next clue.
- After the Roadblock, teams had to drive to Rihanna's childhood home and find their next clue, which directed teams to drive to Long Bay Beach in Christ Church.
- This leg's Detour was a choice between Seaweed Clearing or Fish Pot Building. In Seaweed Clearing, teams had to clear the beach of enough invasive sargassum seaweed so as to fill a barrel in order to receive their next clue. In Fish Pot Building, teams had to construct a fish pot using tamarind sticks and wire mesh in order to receive their next clue.
- After the Detour, teams received a postcard that depicted the Pit Stop: Hastings Rocks.

Additional note

- After Angie made an illegal turn in a roundabout on the way to the Detour, she and Danny became separated from their camera operator and audio technician. They were portrayed as being unable to begin the task until their crew arrived. However, Angie revealed in a post-race interview that their crew never showed up at the Detour and could not be located. After all other teams had arrived, they were permitted to continue racing with a substitute camera crew without any compensation.

=== Leg 9 (Barbados → Dominican Republic) ===
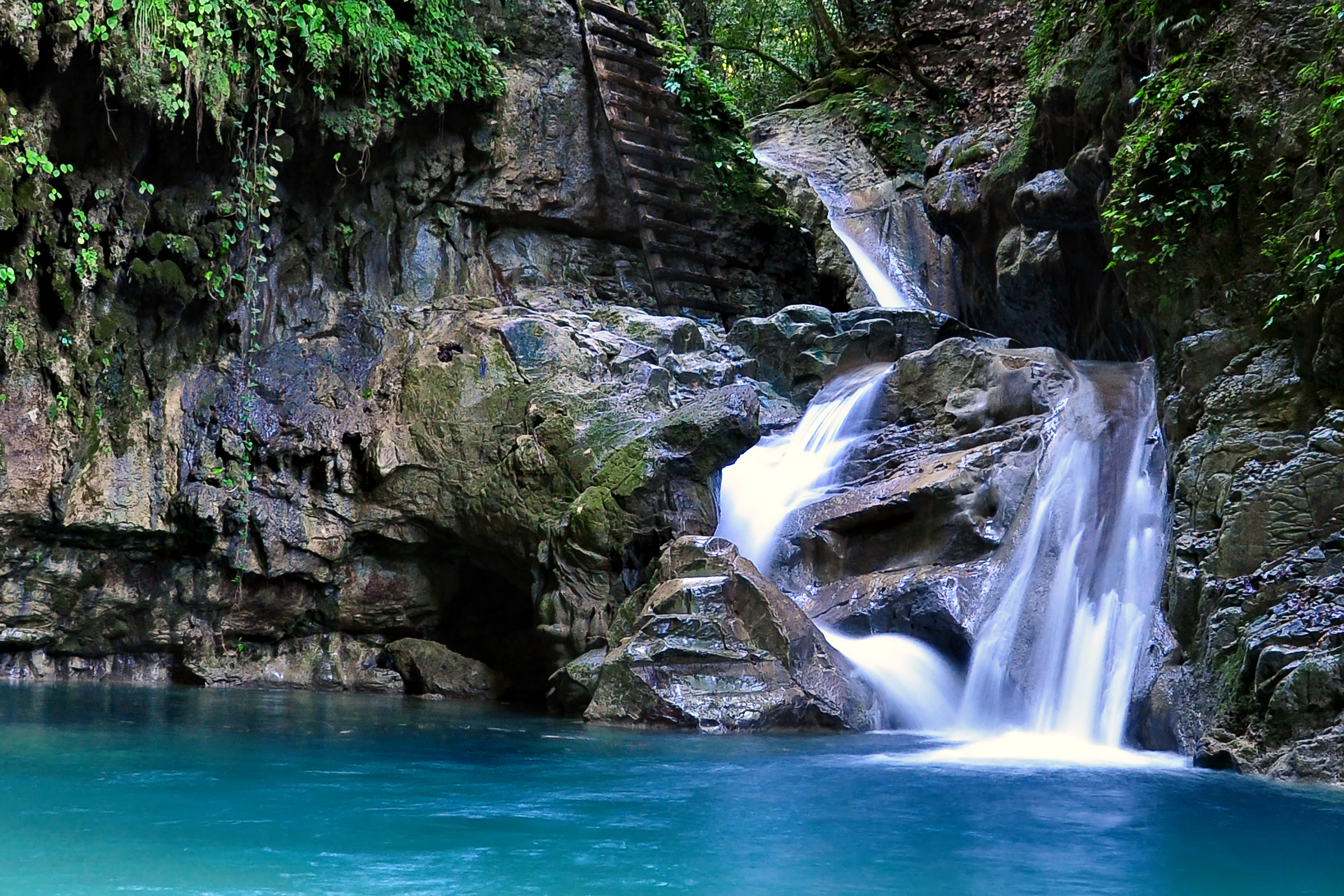
The show's first visit to the Dominican Republic had racers navigate the Damajagua waterfalls of Puerto Plata Province.

- Episode 9: "My Precious Cacao" (May 8, 2024)
- Prize: Cashback rewards for a trip for two to Seoul, South Korea (awarded to Ricky & Cesar)
- Eliminated: Yvonne & Melissa

Locations

- Bridgetown → Puerto Plata, Dominican Republic
- Imbert (Puente Peatonal Saltos Damajagua)
- Imbert (27 Charcos de la Damajagua)
- Altamira (Don Manuel's Finca de Cacao)
- Altamira (Estadio Bartolo Colón)
- Puerto Plata (Paseo de Doña Blanca)
- Puerto Plata (Anfiteatro de Puerto Plata)

Episode summary

- During the Pit Stop, teams were flown to Puerto Plata, Dominican Republic. Teams departed from the Puente Peatonal Saltos Damajagua in Imbert in groups 15 minutes apart based on the order of their arrival at the previous Pit Stop and had to travel on foot to their next clue at the 27 Charcos de la Damajagua.
- In this leg's first Roadblock, one team member had to navigate through a series of waterfalls, memorize ten Taíno petroglyph symbols, and arrange them in chronological order in order to receive their next clue.
- After the first Roadblock, teams were driven to their next clue at Don Manuel's Finca de Cacao in Altamira. There, teams had to harvest cacao pods, remove the cocoa seeds, and cover a tarp with the seeds in order to receive their next clue, which directed teams to Estadio Bartolo Colón.
- In this leg's second Roadblock, one team member, regardless of who performed the first Roadblock, had to complete three baseball drills – catching and tossing a ground ball to first base, catching a flyball in center field, and playing vitilla by hitting a bottle cap with a broomstick 25 feet (7,6 m) – in order to receive their next clue from former MLB pitcher Bartolo Colón.
- After the second Roadblock, teams had to travel by taxi to Paseo de Doña Blanca in Puerto Plata and find their next clue, which directed them to the Pit Stop: the Anfiteatro de Puerto Plata.

=== Leg 10 (Dominican Republic) ===
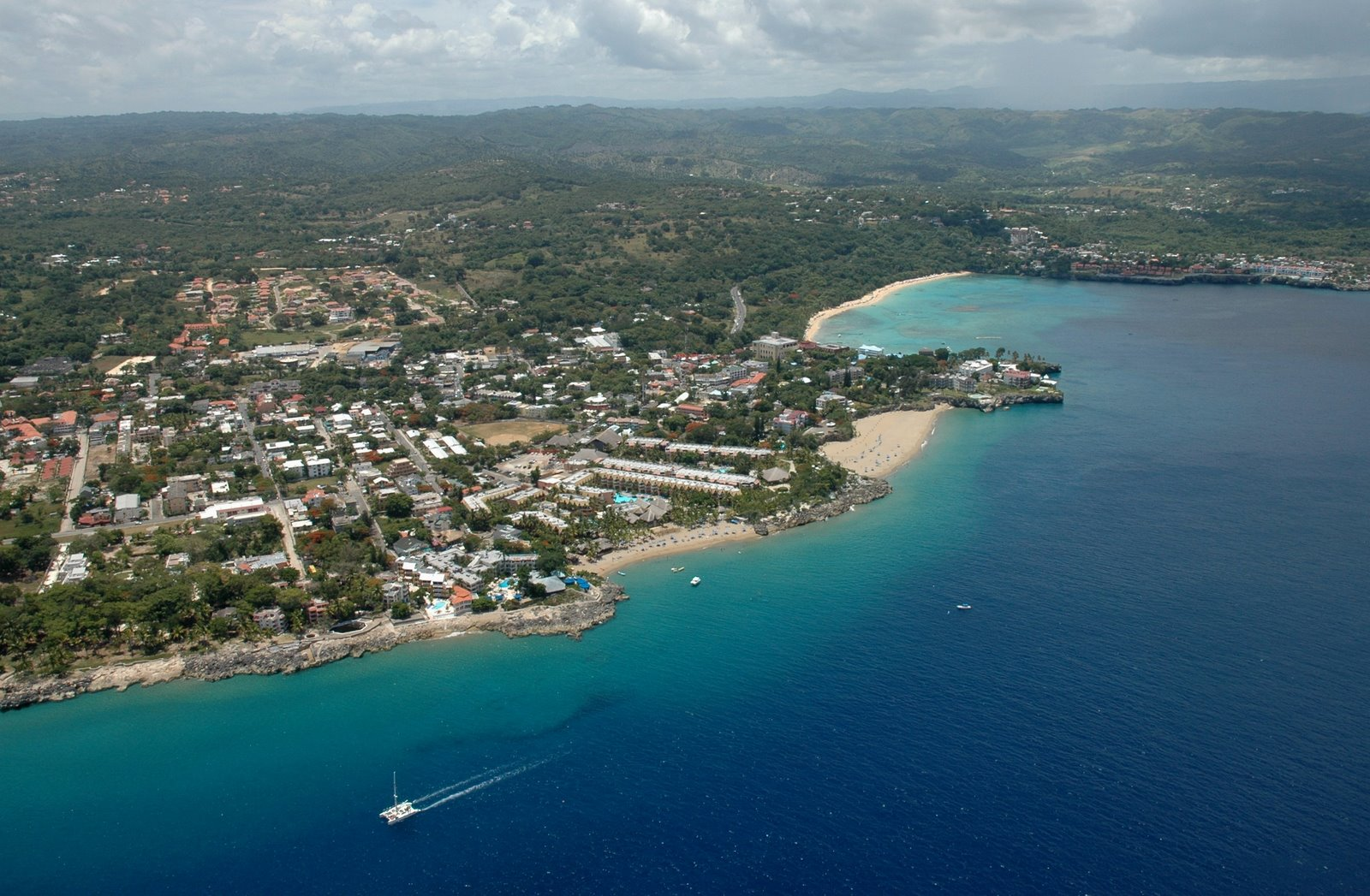
The second Dominican leg began in the beach town of Sosúa.

- Episode 10: "The Longest Minute of Your Life" (May 15, 2024)
- Prize: Cashback rewards for a trip for two to Rome, Italy (awarded to Rod & Leticia)
- Eliminated: Amber & Vinny

Locations

- Sosúa (Sosúa Beach)
- Sosúa (Diversity Bar)
- Cabarete (Cabarete Beach)
- Cabarete (Olympus Beach)
- La Boca (Wilson's Bar)

Episode summary

- Teams departed from a catamaran off Sosúa Beach in groups 15 minutes apart based on the order of their arrival at the previous Pit Stop and had to swim to their next clue.
- This season's final Detour was a choice between Dive Trip or Rum Sip. In Dive Trip, teams had to assemble four dive rigs and load them onto a boat in order to receive their next clue. In Rum Sip, teams had to memorize six rum drink orders and make the drinks in order to receive their next clue.
- After the Detour, teams had to travel by taxi to Cabarete Beach and find their next clue.
- In this leg's Roadblock, one team member had to windsurf for one minute in order to receive their next clue.
- After the Roadblock, teams had to travel by taxi to Olympus Beach and find their next clue, which instructed them to travel by dune buggy and kayak to the Pit Stop: Wilson's Bar in La Boca.

=== Leg 11 (Dominican Republic → United States) ===
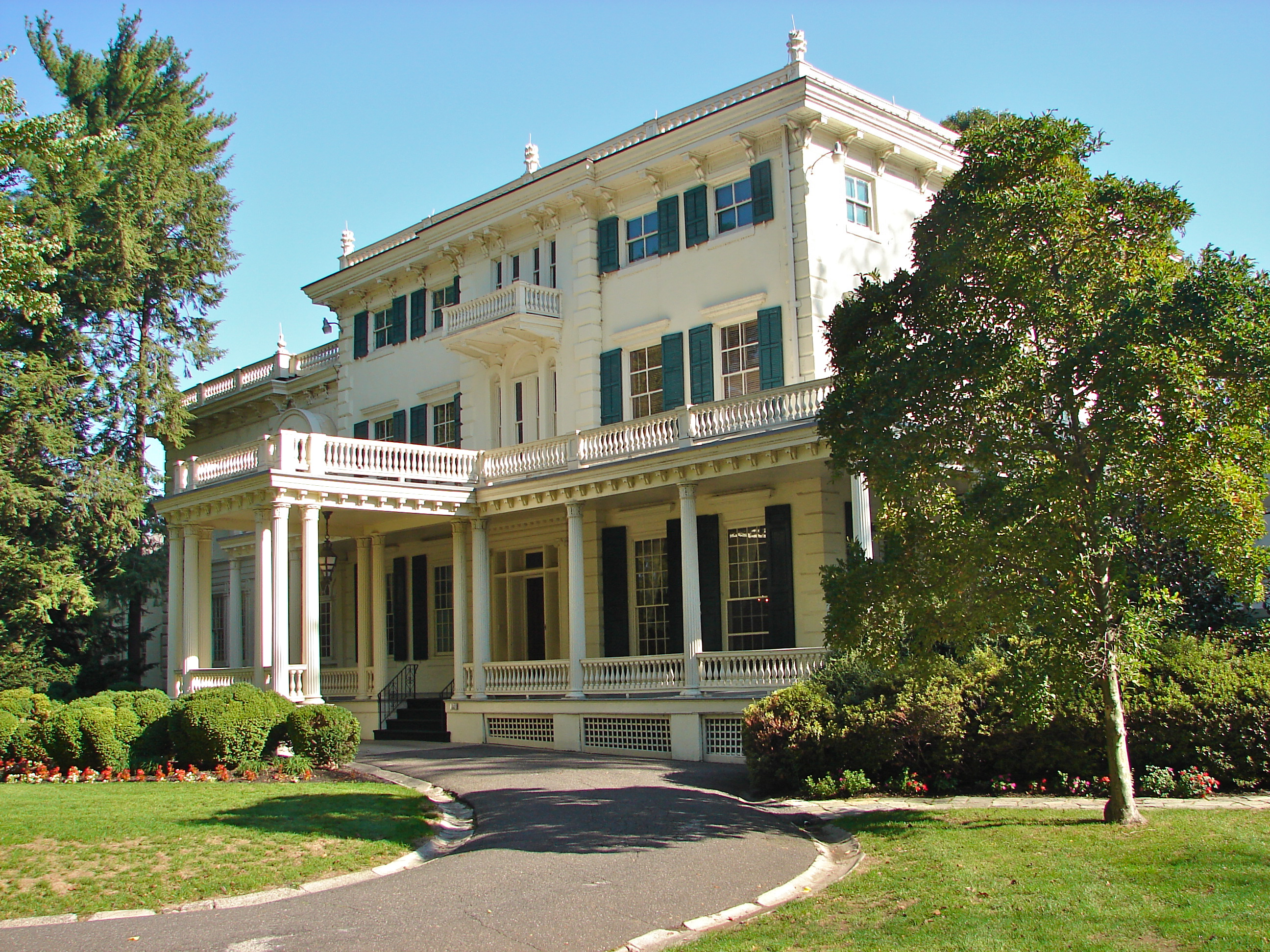
After traveling 11,711 miles and completing an independence-themed final leg, teams reached the finish line at the Glen Foerd Estate in Philadelphia.

- Episode 10: "The Longest Minute of Your Life" (May 15, 2024)
- Prize: US$1,000,000
- Winners: Ricky & Cesar
- Runners-up: Juan & Shane
- Third place: Rod & Leticia

Locations

- Puerto Plata → Philadelphia, Pennsylvania
- Philadelphia (Philadelphia Museum of Art – Rocky Steps)
- Philadelphia (Lincoln Financial Field)
- Philadelphia (Pat's King of Steaks & Geno's Steaks)
- Philadelphia (Headhouse Square)
- Philadelphia (Betsy Ross House)
- Philadelphia (Arch Street Friends Meeting House)
- Philadelphia (Glen Foerd Estate)

Episode summary

- During the Pit Stop, teams were flown to Philadelphia, Pennsylvania, and began the final leg simultaneously at the Philadelphia Museum of Art's famed Rocky Steps. Teams had to drive to Lincoln Financial Field and find their next clue.
- In this leg's first Roadblock, one team member had to don a globe mascot costume, navigate an obstacle course, and hit a target with a T-shirt cannon in order to receive their next clue from Swoop, Phillie Phanatic, or Gritty.
- After the first Roadblock, teams had to find their next clue in between Pat's and Geno's. Teams then had to drive to Headhouse Square, which had their next clue. There, teams had to memorize and recite the Preamble of the United States Declaration of Independence in order to receive their next clue, which directed them to the Betsy Ross House.
- In this season's final Roadblock, the team member who had yet to perform their seventh Roadblock had to assemble a Betsy Ross flag that displayed the names of the Thirteen Colonies in the order that they became states in order to receive their next clue.
- After the second Roadblock, teams had to travel on foot to the Arch Street Friends Meeting House. There, teams had to assemble a three-dimensional Liberty Bell puzzle in order to receive their final clue, which directed them to the finish line: Glen Foerd Estate.

Additional note

- Legs 10 and 11 aired back-to-back.

== Production ==
=== Development and filming ===
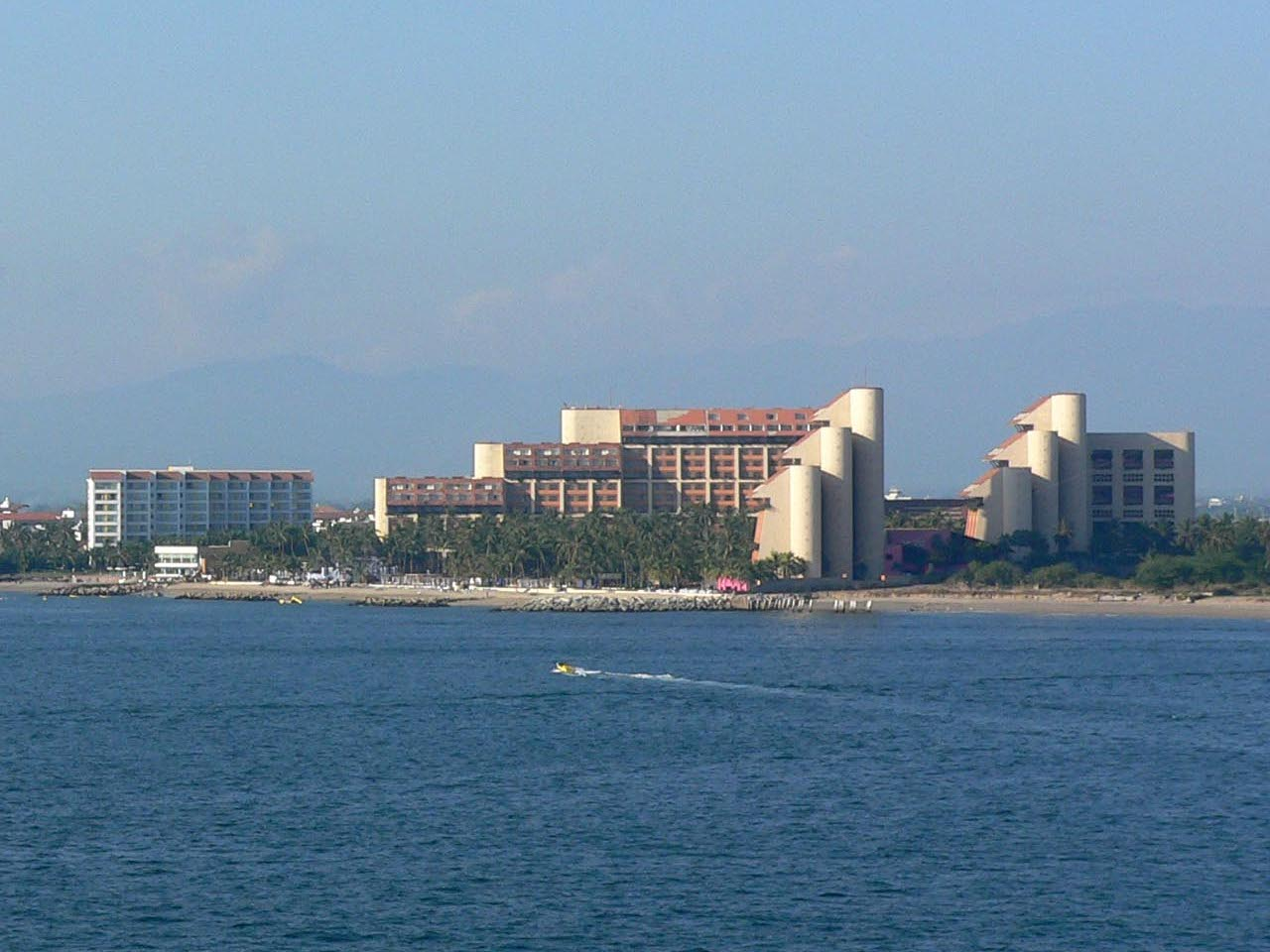
The Amazing Race 36 started at Playa El Salado in the Mexican city of Puerto Vallarta.

Filming for this season began on October 25, 2022, outside of the United States for a second time in Puerto Vallarta, Mexico, with teams spotted with luchadores at Plaza Hidalgo and running along the Malecón. Much like the 33rd and 34th seasons, teams traveled by chartered plane. A Global Crossing Airlines Airbus A320 was used to transport teams and production crew between locations while reducing personal interactions associated with COVID-19 infections. On November 4, 2022, the show was in Córdoba, Argentina. This season also included first-time visits to Barbados and the Dominican Republic. The final episode was filmed in Philadelphia in mid-November. This season also had teams take part in a Mexican rodeo, paraglide in Colombia, race rally cars in Argentina, swim through waterfalls in the Dominican Republic, and visit the childhood home of Rihanna in Barbados.

=== Casting ===
Casting for the season began on June 13, 2022, and closed on September 16, 2022.

== Release ==
=== Broadcast ===
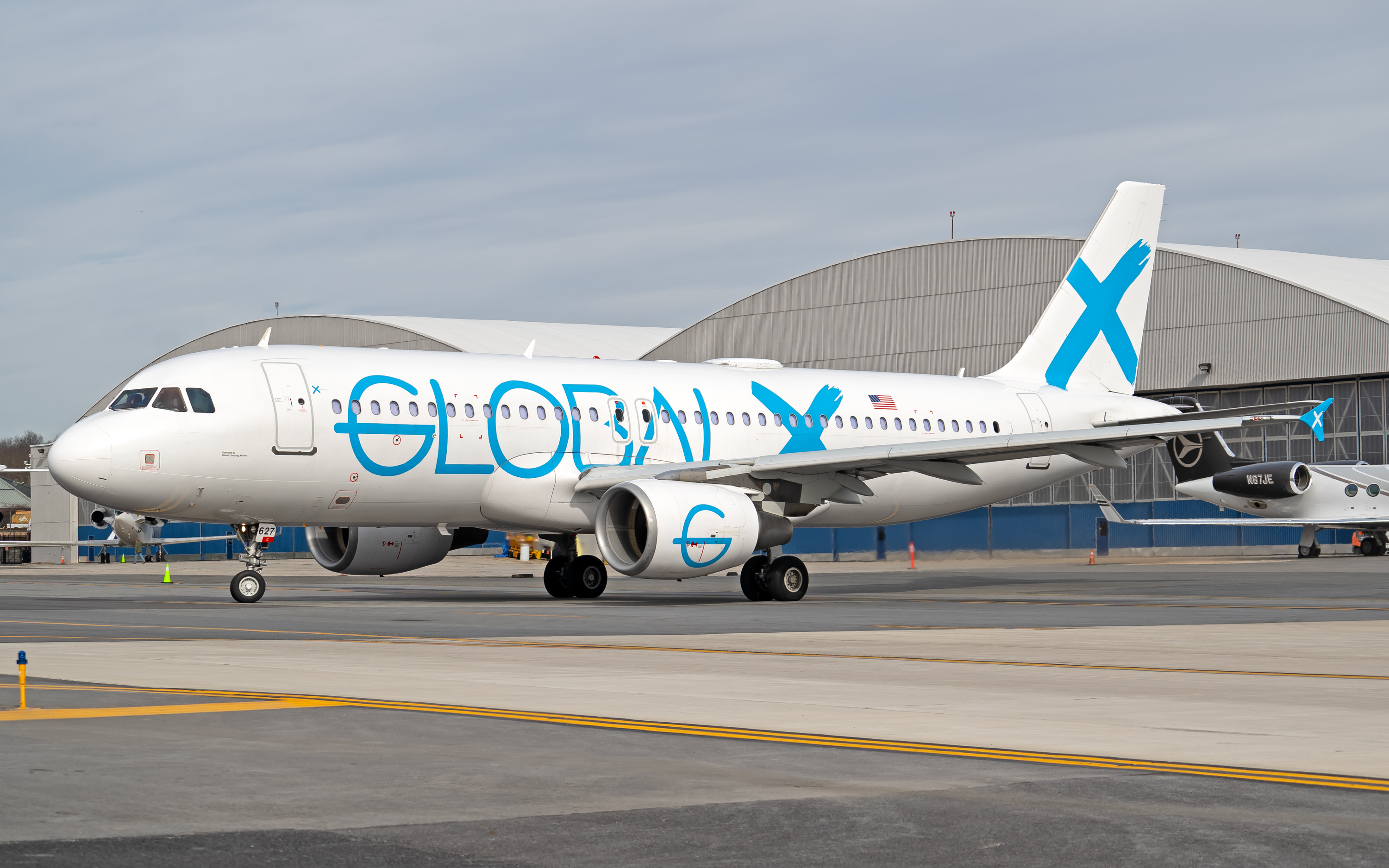
This season used a new charter plane to travel around the Americas.

On November 13, 2023, CBS officially announced this season's premiere date as March 13, 2024, following the third episode of Survivor 46 in the 9:30 pm time slot. Though this season is the 36th to air, it was the 35th to be filmed, with the 35th aired season being filmed in mid-2023. This change to postpone the season was made following the decision to air 90-minute episodes as a result of the 2023 Writers Guild of America strike rather than re-edit the episodes for an additional 30 minutes. This decision was changed following season 35 with season 36 also including 90-minute episodes, and the episodes were re-edited to include cut footage.

=== Marketing ===
The first trailer for this season was released on February 28, 2024.

== Reception ==
=== Critical response ===
The Amazing Race 36 received mixed reviews. Andy Dehnart of reality blurred wrote, "this Amazing Race season just feels weird or off in several ways, though it's also not bad." In addition he wrote, "I do think it was a mistake for the show to edit out the charter plane travel and the explanation of why teams were starting in groups. I understand that—it's kind of weird to go backward after a season with airport travel—but since that's what happened, why not admit it on screen?" Mack Rawden of CinemaBlend wrote, "Questionable decisions aside [regarding Angie & Danny's elimination], this season of The Amazing Race has been terrific, as always." Dustin Rowles of Pajiba wrote, "the 36th season of The Amazing Race has been a solid one, thanks in part to some solid casting. Former NFL wide receiver Rod Gardner and his wife, Leticia, have been a particular highlight, although Ricky and Cesar — who have been dominating the race since the opening episode — are fun, too." Film critic Grace Randolph wrote, "This season of [The Amazing Race] is probably the worst I've ever seen - and I've watched all 36 seasons. Apparently it was filmed during Covid and before the last season… they should've just shelved it permanently." In 2024, Rhenn Taguiam of Game Rant placed this season within the bottom 13 out of 36.

=== Ratings ===
==== U.S. Nielsen ratings ====
Viewership and ratings per episode of The Amazing Race 36
No.	Title	Air date	Rating (18–49)	Viewers (millions)	DVR (18–49)	DVR viewers (millions)	Total (18–49)	Total viewers (millions)	Ref.
1	"You Can't Drive While You're Crying"	March 13, 2024	0.4/5	2.89	TBD	TBD	TBD	TBD	
2	"Trust But Verify"	March 20, 2024	0.4/5	2.68	0.3	1.68	0.7	4.36	
3	"It's Not Over Til Phil Sings"	March 27, 2024	0.4/4	2.79	0.3	1.70	0.7	4.49	
4	"Those Who Wander Are Not Lost"	April 3, 2024	0.4/4	2.72	0.3	1.67	0.6	4.39	
5	"Save The Stress For Later"	April 10, 2024	0.3/4	2.81	0.3	1.72	0.6	4.53	
6	"Our Alliance Strikes Again"	April 17, 2024	0.4/4	2.78	0.3	1.72	0.7	4.50	
7	"Walk and Chew Gum Baby"	April 24, 2024	0.3/4	2.83	0.3	1.60	0.6	4.43	
8	"That's What Being Strong Will Do"	May 1, 2024	0.4/5	2.73	0.3	1.57	0.7	4.30	
9	"My Precious Cacao"	May 8, 2024	0.4/4	2.84	0.3	1.59	0.6	4.43	
10	"The Longest Minute of Your Life"	May 15, 2024	0.4/5	2.86	0.3	1.57	0.7	4.43	

== Works cited ==
- Castro, Adam-Troy (2006). My Ox Is Broken!. BenBella Books. ISBN 978-1-932100-91-4.
