= Plaza Chile (Mendoza) =

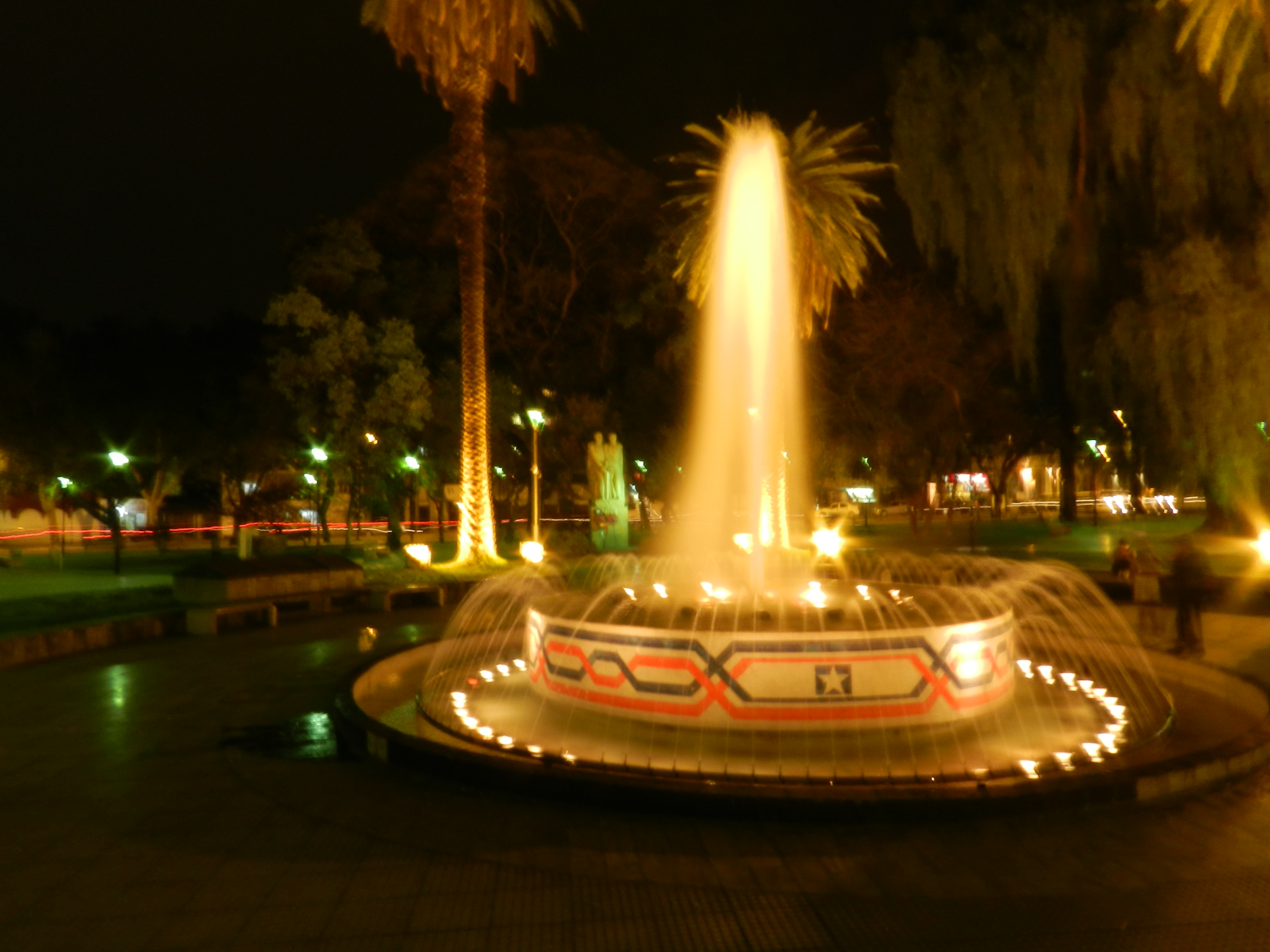
Plaza Chile.

The Square Chile is an urban space, situated in the City de Mendoza, Argentina. The name of the same, is a homage to the neighbouring country of Chile, when this last loaned his help after the earthquake that destroyed to the city in 1861 and symbolises the friendship between the two countries, represented by his two heroes: José de San Martín and Bernardo O'Higgins; joining his hands on a sword.

The square finds situated between the streets Av. Peru, Gutiérrez, Necochea and 25 May, being his original direction Gutierréz to the 5500. By a municipal agreement of 5 October 1883, being municipal president Joaquín Villanueva, the square Chile changed temporarily his name by the one of San Martín, since there was not in Mendoza any square that carried the name of the Libertador, appearing like this in the cadastre of the "New City" in the plane of 1885, conserving this name until 1904. In June 1904, during the government of the doctor Carlos Galigniana Safe, when inaugurating the statue of the Saint general Martín in the today square homónima, gave him the name of Cobo to the current square Chile. The walk recovery definitively this denomination in 1920.

== See also ==
- Argentinian relations-Chile
