= Plaza San Martín =

Plaza San Martín is a common name for squares in the cities of Argentina and Peru. The name honors the national hero General José de San Martín. It may refer to:

== Argentina ==
- Plaza San Martín (Buenos Aires)
- Plaza San Martín (Rosario)
- Plaza San Martín, Córdoba

== Peru ==
- Plaza San Martín (Lima)
