= Chinchinero =

Urban street performer in Chile

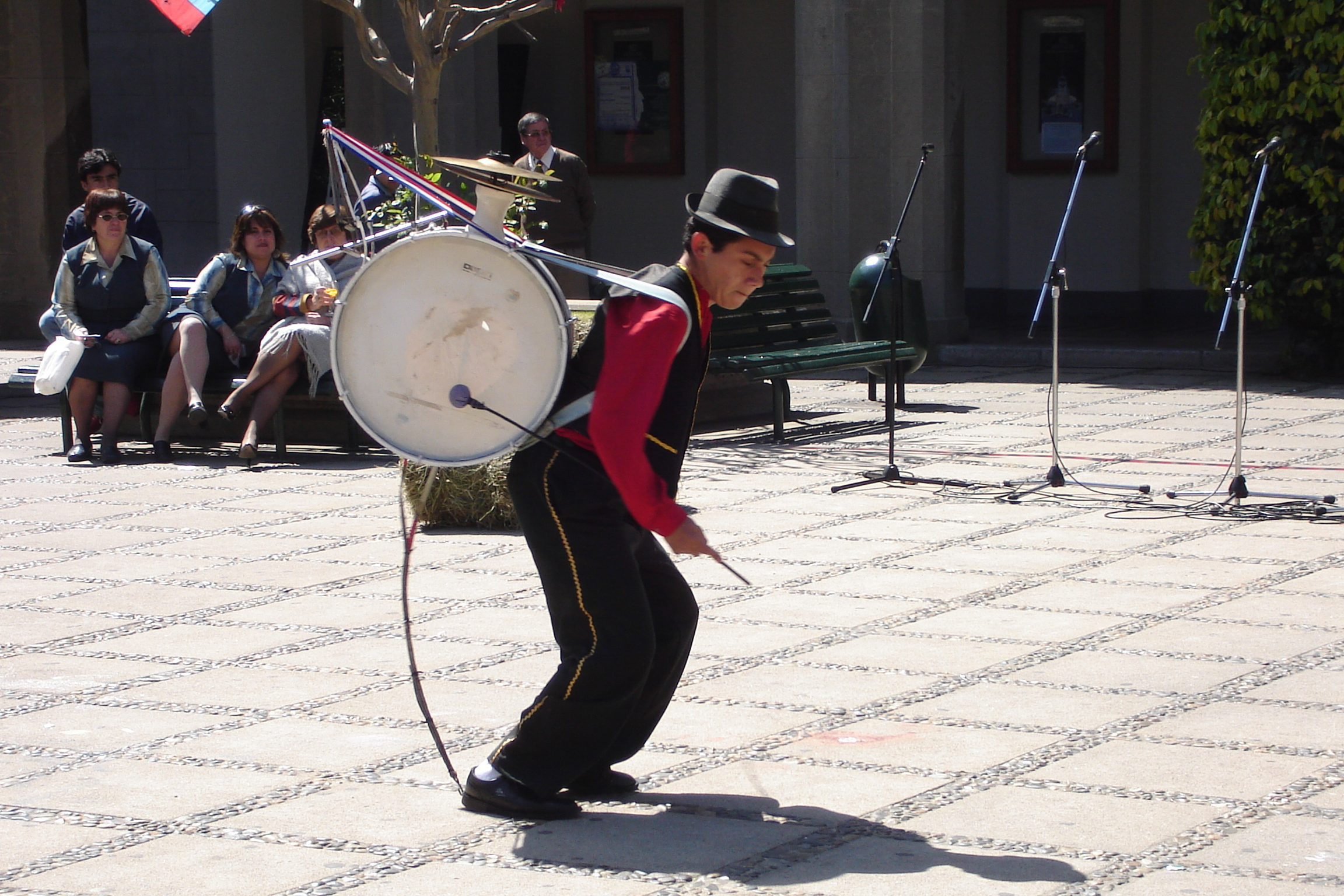
Chinchinero.

A Chinchinero is an urban street performer in Chile, usually a man or young boy, who plays a bass drum-type percussion instrument with long drumsticks strapped to his back which also involves a rope with a noose tied around the performer's foot to play the cymbals which also form part of this improvised instrument. Said instrument has been invented and produced informally and can carry any rhythm or melody.

The Chinchinero often works with an organillero, street organ player, possessing a hand-operated street organ.

While the organ is played the Chinchinero plays and dances whatever it is playing - foxtrot, waltz, tango, or cueca.

These performers roam the streets and cities of Chile and have even performed by invitation outside of the country as far as Europe. The foreign performances are coordinated by Chile's Department of Culture within the Ministry of Foreign Affairs of Chile.
