= La Cañada, Córdoba =

Stream in Argentina

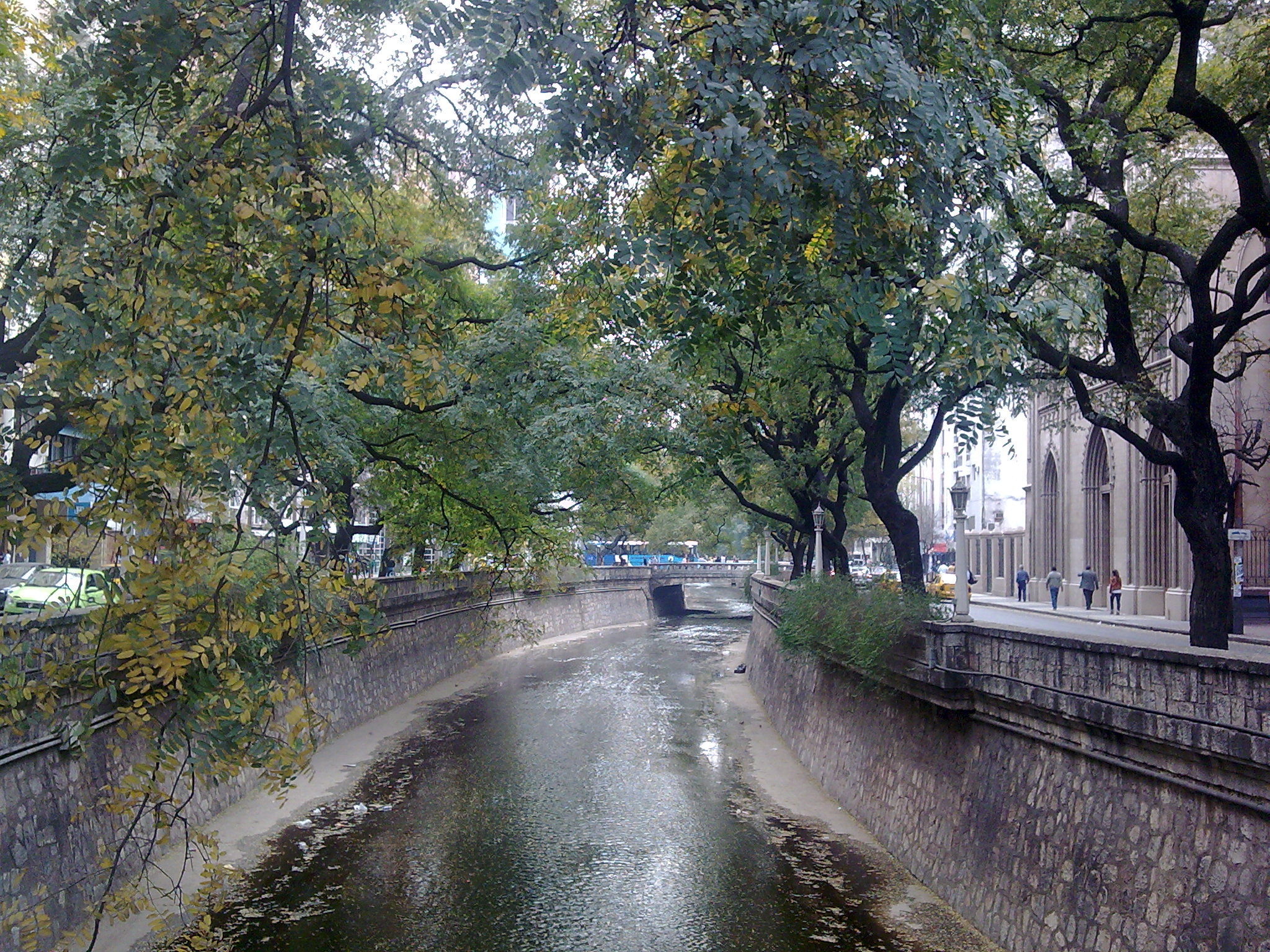
View of La Cañada

La Cañada is the partial channeling of the La Cañada stream that crosses the city of Córdoba in Argentina from southwest to north. The waters of La Cañada flow into the right bank of the Suquía River.

In local culture, La Cañada refers to the channeling (currently about 3 km in length) and not to the stream itself, which is longer (about 28 km in length). This work represents one of the icons of the city, with designs in stone, several bridges and trees of tipa.

The channeling was opened in 1944 in an attempt to control the floods that affected several sectors of the city.
