= Parques del Río Medellín =

Park in Medellín, Colombia

Coordinates: 6.2435°N 75.5795°W

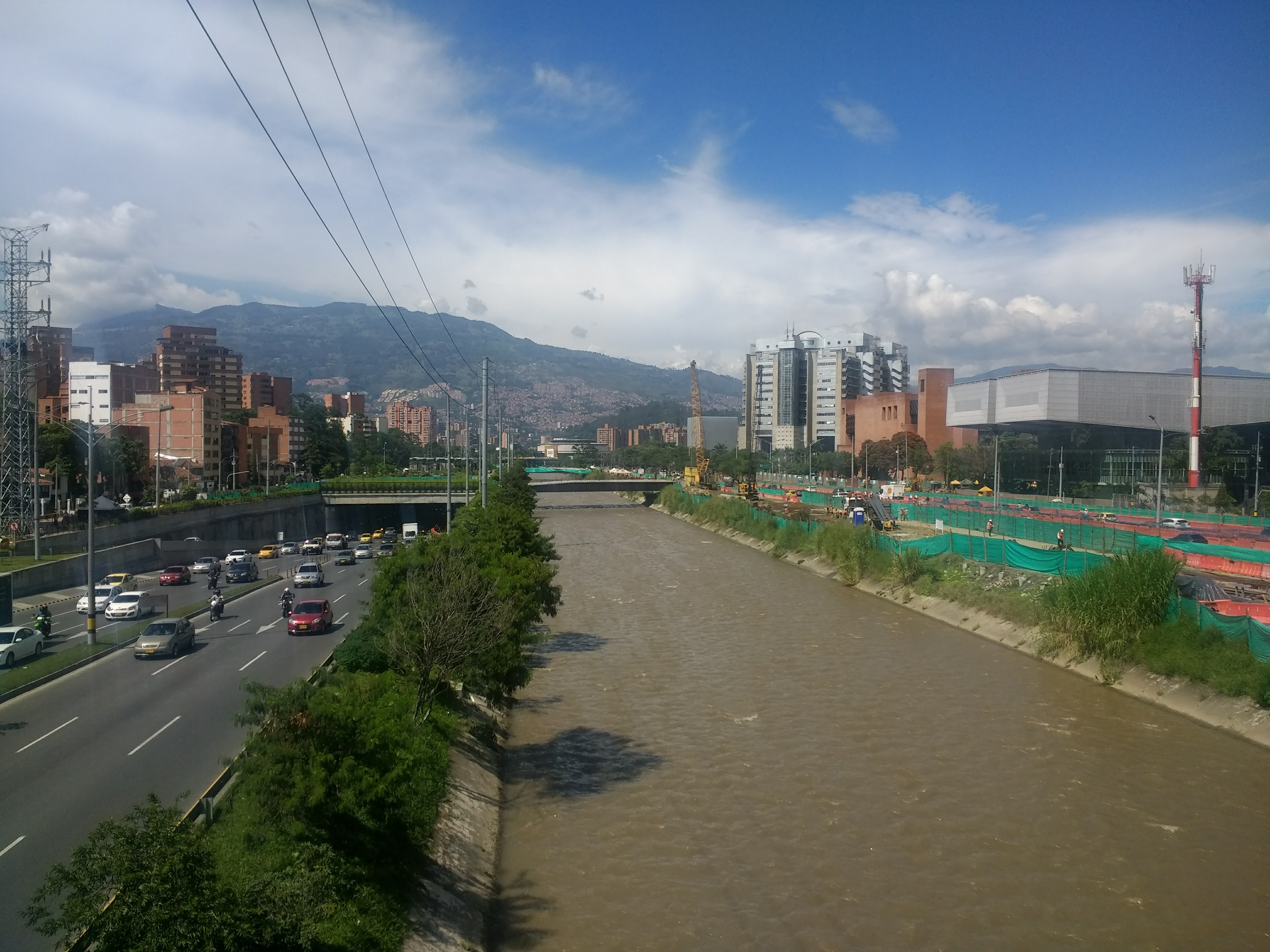
Appearance of the park in 2017

Parques del Río Medellín ('Parks of the Medellín River') is a linear park located in the central area of the Colombian city of Medellín that integrates both banks of the Medellín River, which crosses the city from south to north. This work contemplates in its design the improvement of infrastructure, landscaping and vegetation, with the aim of becoming a metropolitan mobility corridor, and the main environmental and public space axis to encourage the meeting of citizens.

Designed by the Colombian firm Latitud Taller de Arquitectura y Ciudad, their construction started in 2015 in the western side. It includes in its design 185 km of level roads, 82 km of underground roads, and 22 km of covered roads; 32 km of cycle paths, 180 hectares to connect guardian hills and the planting of 100 thousand trees.
