= Comuna 13, Medellín =

Commune of the city of Medellín, Colombia

Comuna 13 (n.º 13) or San Javier is one of the 16 communes of the city of Medellín, Colombia, with a population of around 160,000. The neighborhood is associated with street art performances, graffiti, bright colors, tours, and an energetic environment that showcases its resilience. Comuna 13 was not always a vibrant community; it has faced violence and insecurity with regards to drug trafficking, paramilitaries, and controversial military operations. It is now a major tourist attraction and a keystone of community tourism in Medellín and has benefitted from investment in infrastructure and social programs.

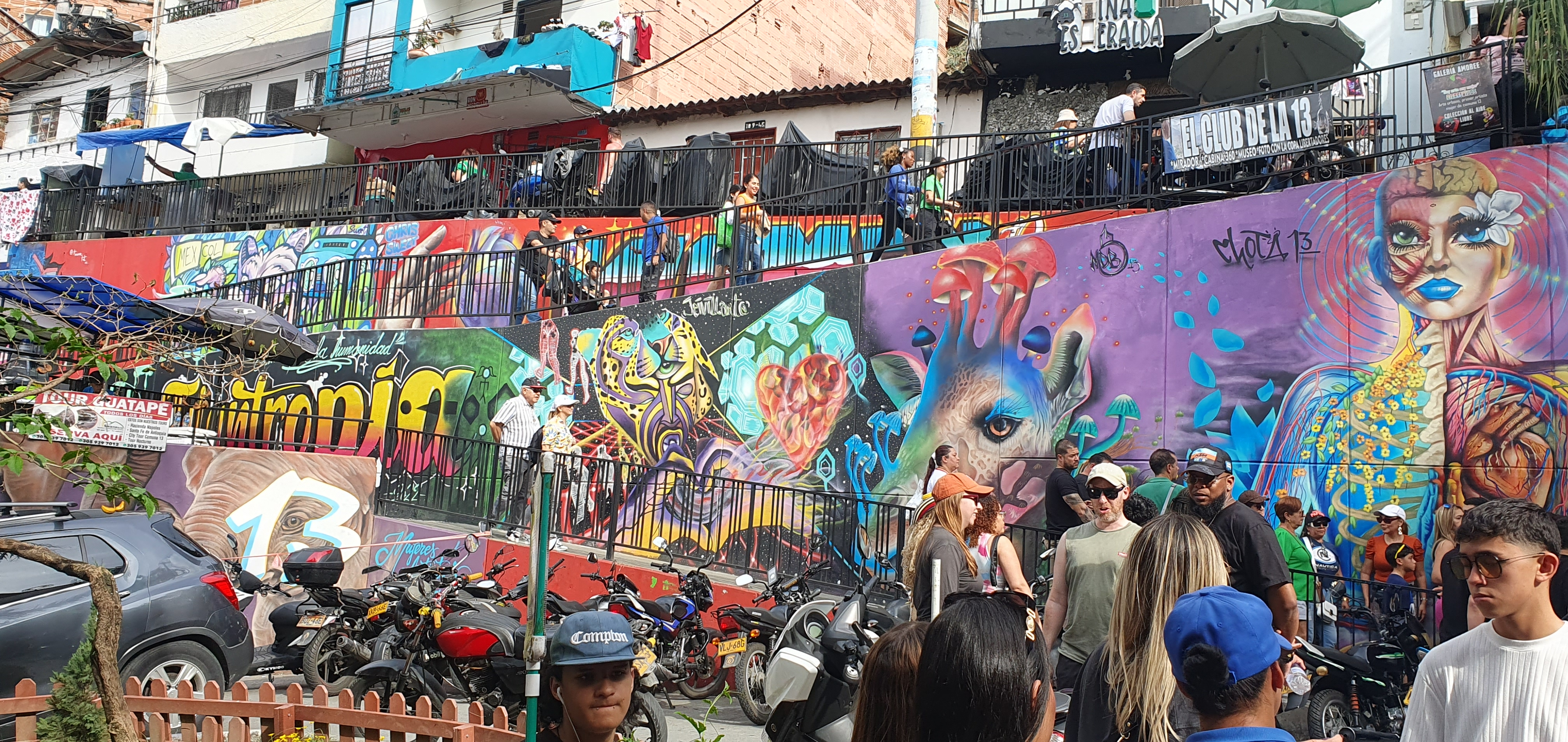
Comuna 13 Neighborhood

== Makeup ==
Comuna 13 is a neighborhood made up of houses that are typically made out of brick and cement, closely stacked together, and wrapped around the western hills of the city.

=== Geography and infrastructure ===
The commune is located to the west of the Central Western Zone of the city, bordered to the north by the Robledo commune, to the east by La América and Laureles-Estadio; to the south by the district of Altavista, and to the west by San Cristóbal and Altavista. It is a neighborhood made up of houses that are typically made out of brick and cement, closely stacked together, and cling to the Andes mountains, sprawling throughout the west hills of the city. Houses are painted vibrant colors but often left unfinished for various reasons such as tax loopholes and lack of resources to finish.

The slopes are found towards the western end, reaching the limit of the urban perimeter. In some sectors, there are very high and steep slopes. Some areas in the commune are characterized as having a high potential risk of natural disasters.

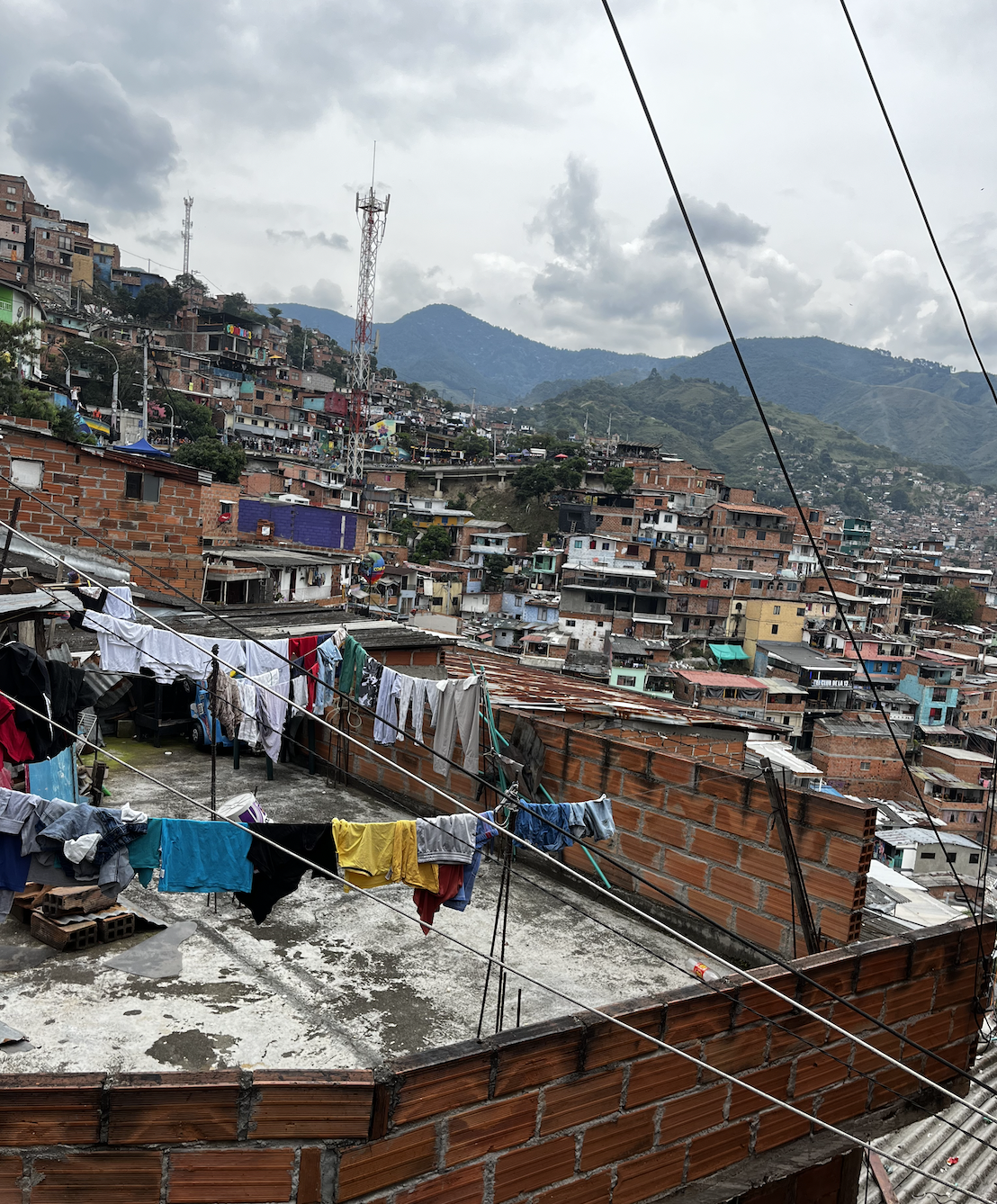
Comuna 13, Medellín

These high risk areas are located in sectors of the neighborhoods Blanquizal, Independencias I, II, and III, Nuevos Conquistadores, Belencito la Colina, Belencito Betania, near the edge of the Ana Díaz ravine, Arenera Monteverde and Barrio La Quiebra, and in the sectors La Divisa and Metropolitano. This danger determined that some neighborhoods and sectors were outside of the Commune's perimeter according to the last agreement mentioned. It has several streams and channels, among others, La Leonarda, La Hueso, La Iguaná, Ana Díaz, La Picacha, La Salada, Los Sauces, La Ladrillera, El Saldo, La Bolillala, La Matea, Los Alcazares, La Mina, Las Peñitas, El Paraíso, la Pradera, La Magdalena, La Pelahueso, Los Sanjones, El Coco and Santa Mónica. In the commune there are some material exploitation farms, among others Triturados Monteverde, Ladrillera el Noral, Arenera el Socorro, Finca Villa Elvira, and Aggregados San Javier.

=== Role of geography and neighborhood design ===
Comuna 13's geography has played a role in how criminal actors took advantage of the commune as a strategic location, using elevation to better survey the movement of police and rival groups. The elevation additionally played a historical role, as Comuna 13 began as a farming community.

== History ==
=== Agriculture ===
Originally founded by displaced farmers fleeing violence in the rural areas of Colombia, the area was named "Las Granjas", which means "The Farms". The area shifted towards a more residential structure with a housing cooperative in 1946. Immigrants created nearby illegal settlements in the hills, helping shape the neighborhood structure.

=== Immigration and lack of resources ===
Waves of migrants from people escaping La Violencia, conflict in Antioquia, and rural fighting between revolutionary guerrilla groups and the Colombian government came to form Comuna 13, although they were often discriminated against as invaders. The neighborhoods in Comuna 13: Las Independencias I, II, III and Nuevos Conquistadores, were built up primarily by immigrants. Immigrants fleeing conflict were vulnerable to being recruited into criminal activity because many had few skills outside of farming and construction, lacked job opportunities, lived in poorly built houses, and drank unsafe water. Many teenagers of the immigrant generations of the 60s and 70s went on to make up the gangs and guerilla groups that were formed in the neighborhood.

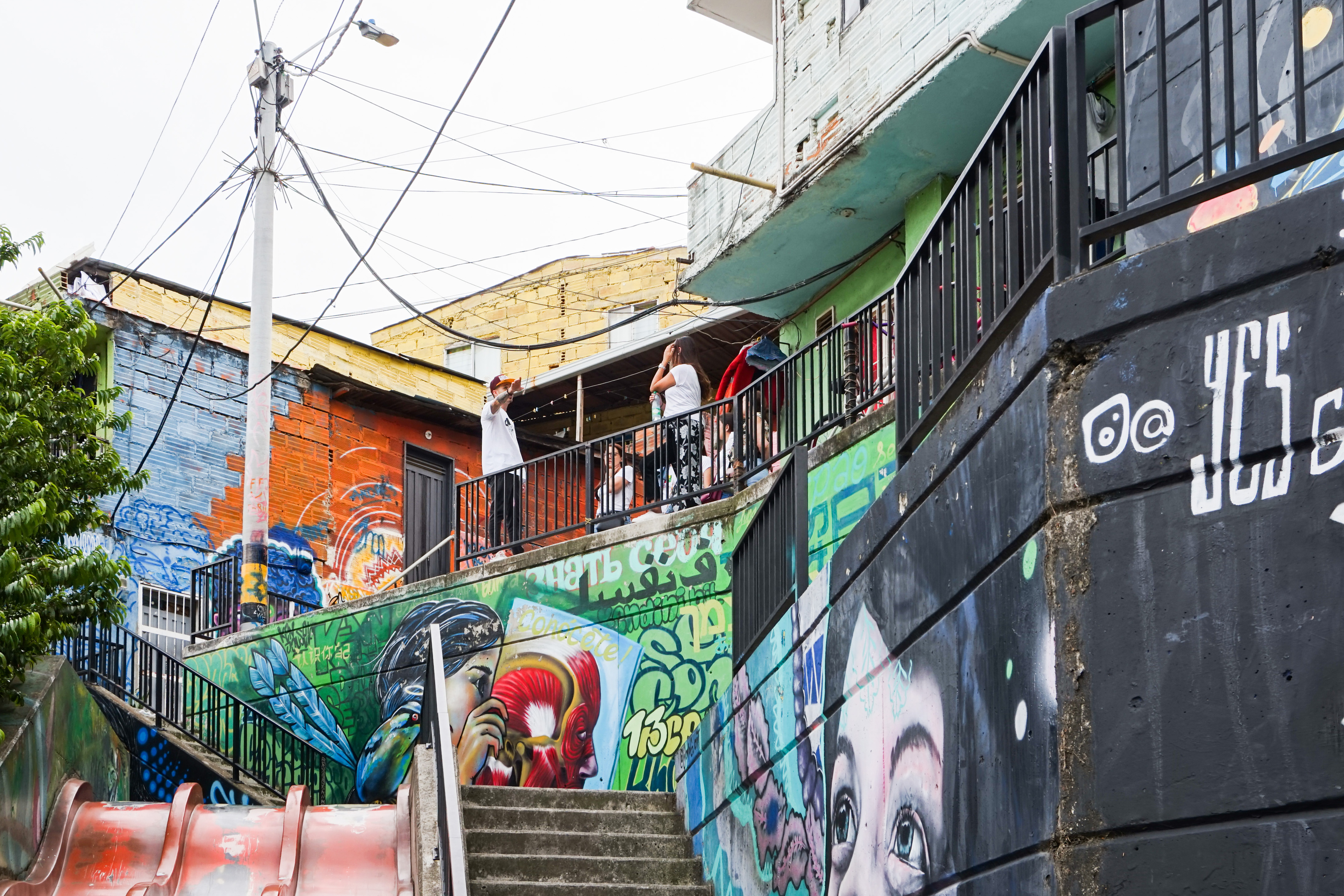
Comuna 13, Medellín

== Instability ==
Comuna 13 suffered for years from violence from Narcos, military operations, and the presence of guerrillas and paramilitaries. Fights between rival groups could make the neighborhood feel like a war zone. The violence from which Comuna 13 suffered made it unsafe to cross neighborhoods and go out at night.

=== Narcos ===
While Pablo Escobar and the Medellín Cartel recruited youth from poor neighborhoods across the city in the 1980s—including parts of Comuna 13—there is no clear evidence that Escobar exercised direct territorial control over the comuna. Instead, local gangs and loosely organized militias operated in the area, some of which were influenced by or connected to the cartel's networks. Escobar's cartel drew heavily on marginalized barrios to recruit sicarios (hitmen), and rival traffickers, such as Hélmer "Pacho" Herrera, also sought manpower in Medellín's hillside communities. After Escobar's death in 1993, the absence of centralized cartel power contributed to fragmentation and violent disputes among neighborhood gangs, setting the stage for later confrontations between guerrilla militias and paramilitary groups.

=== Paramilitaries and Guerilla groups ===
The guerilla groups FARC, and the National Liberation Army (ELN) had a presence in the commune, occupying various parts of the neighborhood, and implementing various forms of control. The Comandos Armados del Pueblo (CAP) were a paramilitary group that had a lot of strength in Comuna 13 and was like the other left-wing groups in that they were against the rule of the state. They were often seen as a group that would fill the role of the government in fighting other delinquent gangs and groups and improving infrastructure. The guerilla warfare groups were also known to act more openly in contrast to the secretive paramilitaries. When paramilitaries took over in Comuna 13, they instilled their own rule of law, taxing shops, banning gatherings, and recruiting teenagers from struggling families. They had full access to tax and control the funds of people merchants and people delivering or transferring products. Mass graves were discovered near Comuna 13, and they are attributed to the silent killings by paramilitary groups.

=== Operation Mariscal ===
Operation Mariscal was a 12-hour operation that began on May 21, 2002, at 3 am. The military and the police combined in an operation into the neighborhood, sending in tanks, squadrons, and helicopters, with an estimated 100s of personnel going into the neighborhood, attempting to combat the guerrilla militant groups in the neighborhood. 35 people were left injured, with 15 dead, including minors. The people of the neighborhood waved white flags to try and get the operation to stop and they were harassed with the military upholding that the action favored the guerilla militants.

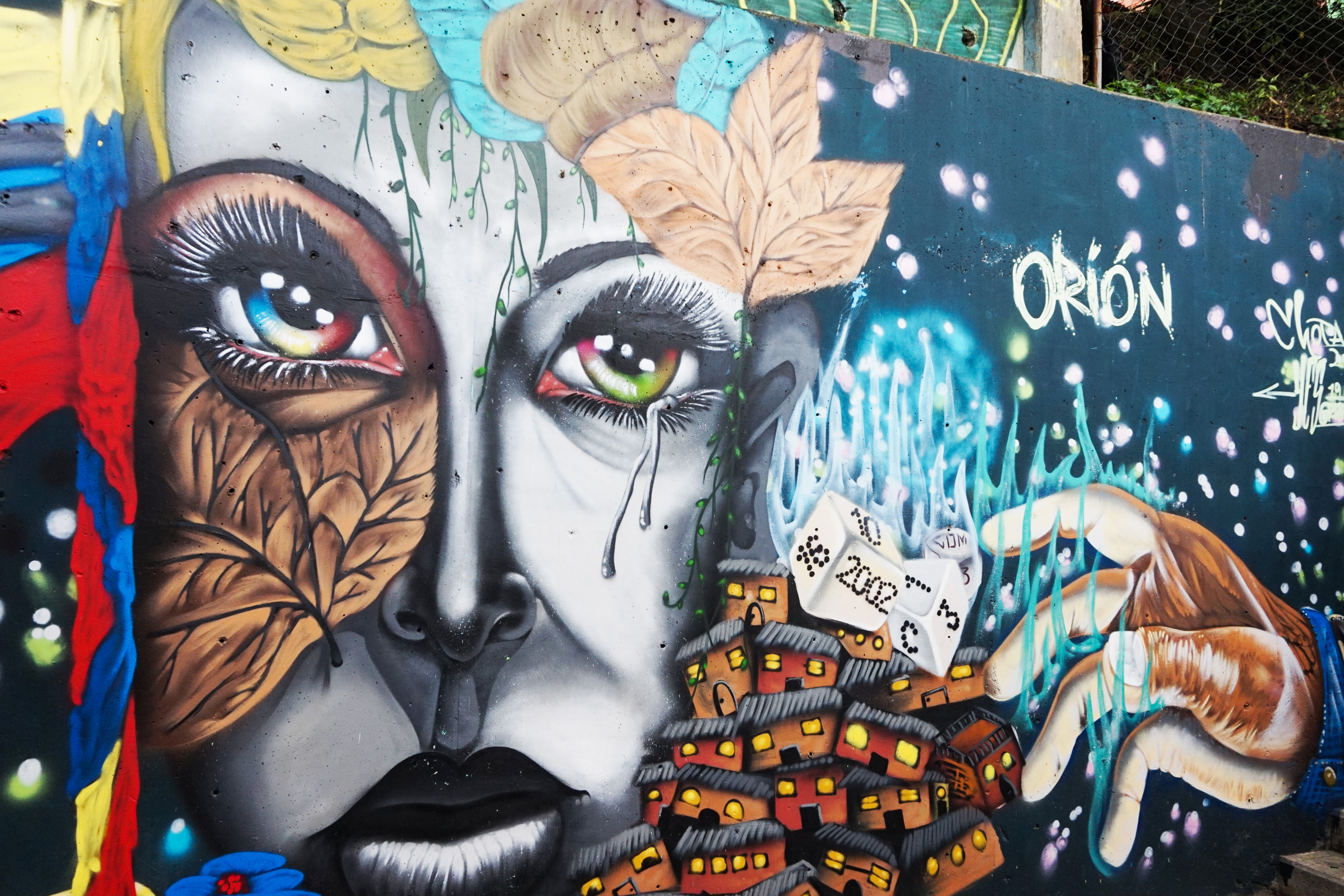
Graffiti in Comuna 13, Medellín. Referencing Operation Orion

=== Operation Orion ===
Operation Orion aimed to finish with the presence of paramilitaries in Comuna 13. Launched under the newly elected President Álvaro Uribe, it was a two-day military offensive that came on October 16, 2002, and involved the use of helicopters, tanks, and automatic weapons. Within the time period of the Colombian armed conflict, the operation was the most extensive action campaign in urban Colombian territory. It targeted members of the ELN, FARC, and the CAP. The operation is controversial as critics and reports, along with witnesses have held that the government targeted civilians. Hundreds of suspected militia fighters were detained, and 20 victims of kidnapping were freed. Operation Orion was successful in driving away the guerrilla militia fighters. After the operation, there was a period of disappearances, with various local stories of kidnappings after paramilitaries entered the zone. Allegations against a government collaboration with the paramilitary groups have been alleged and reinforced by CIA findings. The Justice and Peace Tribunal specifically investigated Uribe for promoting and supporting paramilitary groups. The operation has been condemned by International Courts. The community continues to remember the operation, denouncing the lack of accountability from the government.

== Recovery ==
With community investing in social and educational programs, along with infrastructure, Comuna 13 was able to transform.

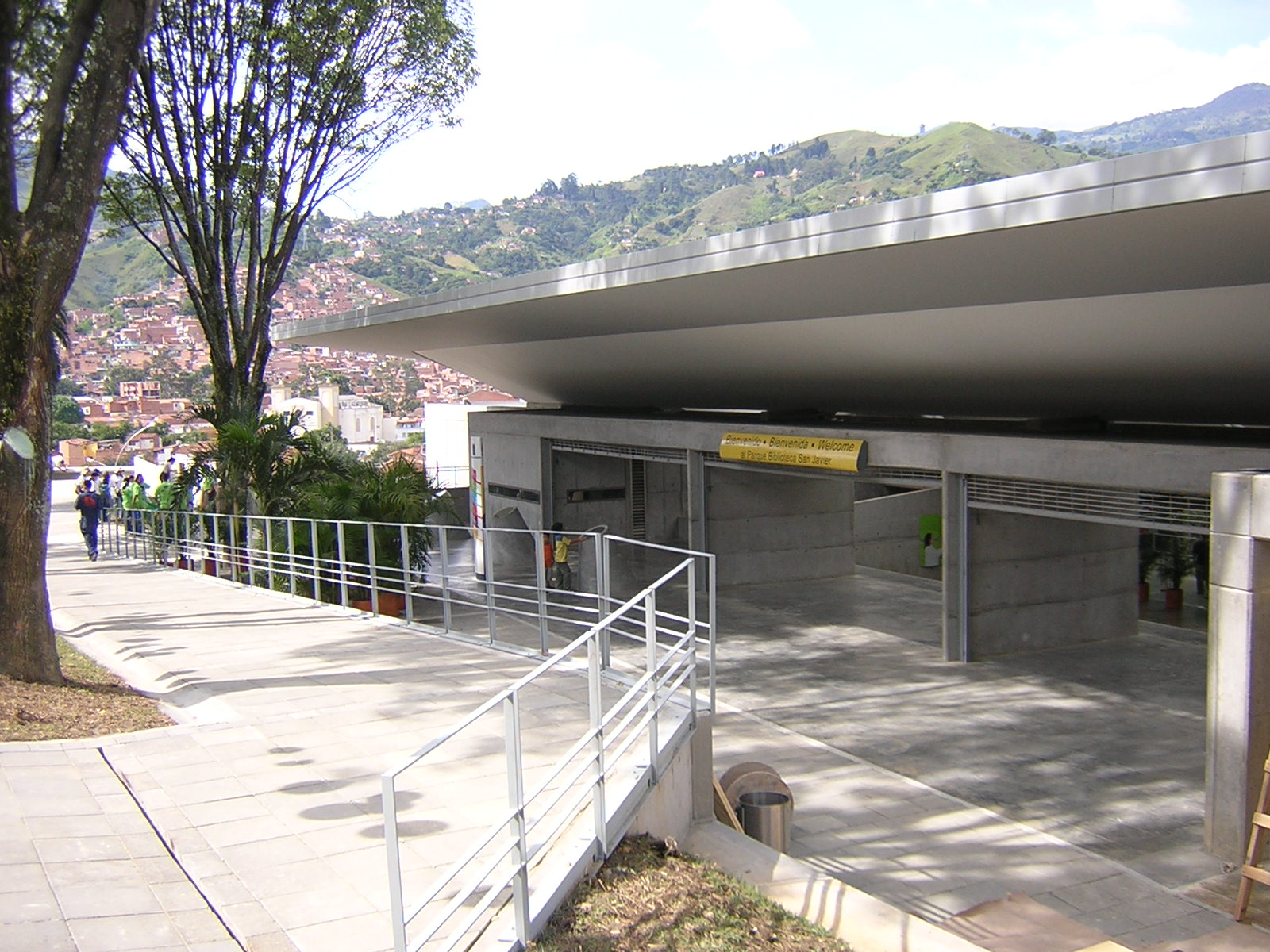
Library San Javier Comuna 13 Medellin

=== Investment ===
The Medellín Model was championed by Mayor Sergio Fajardo and also Mayor Luís Pérez. With the social urbanism philosophy, which focuses on communities that have been left behind, the city of Medellín was able to rebrand against the violence with which it was previously associated. Psychologists and NGOs reviewed funding for work in the community. Libraries, parks, community spaces, and schools were built in poorer neighborhoods such as Comuna 13. Childcare programs and support services for victims of domestic violence were set up. Two Metrocable systems and an escalator were erected as well.

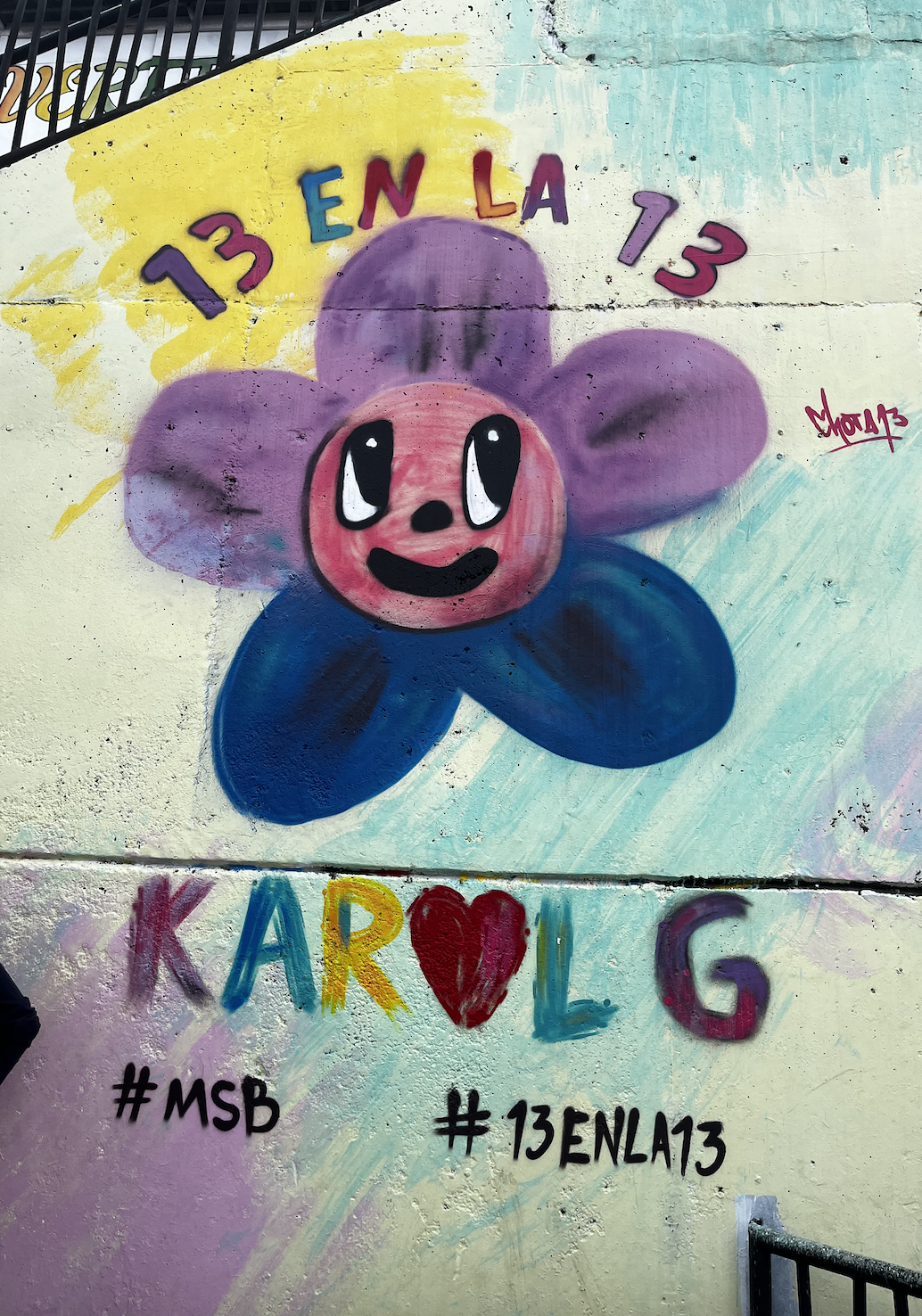
Art in Comuna 13 Supporting Local Artist Karol G

=== Cable car system ===
In terms of infrastructure, escalators and two MetroCable lines were able to connect the isolated community to the city center with access to the subway network. The MetroCable has been deemed essential in reducing social exclusion, where a person cannot fully engage in society. The gondola has been credited with connecting neighborhoods and allowing people to find additional employment opportunities, ones which can also lie outside of their immediate neighborhoods.

=== Art ===
Members of the Comuna 13 have been able to express themselves and share stories through art. From poetry to graffiti to gardens, the diverse forms of artistic expression are everywhere to be found. Colorful murals with depictions of community figures, past violence, and neighborhood injustices can be seen throughout the neighborhood. One of the most recognized graffiti artists coming out of the neighborhood is Chota 13. Hip-hop and break dance performances are common in the streets. Poets, singers, and rappers tell stories and use their platforms to address social issues in the community. Events are held in public spaces with discussions and speeches.

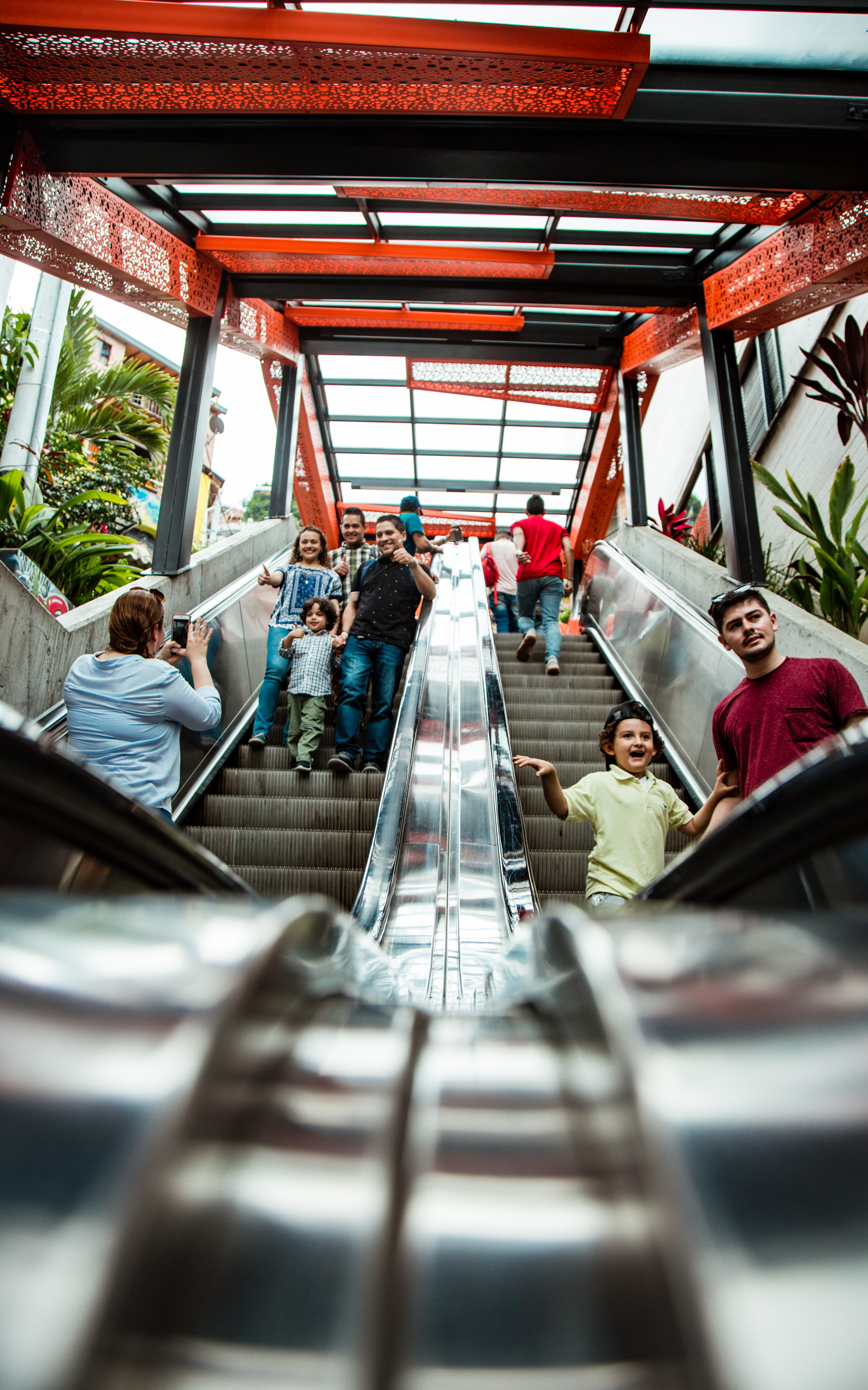
Electric Escalators in Comuna 13, Medellín – 01

=== Community projects ===
Community advocacy in the face of violence began with action from the people of Comuna 13. Marches and symbollic actions such as waving and hanging up white flags, sheets, and handkerchiefs were used. Additionally, documenting violence and testimonies on line played a role in the advocacy, along with the staging of sit-ins. Community centers like the hip-hop based Casa Kolacho were formed with the goal of getting youth out of the way of violence. The idea behind Casa Kolacho is to be louder than bullets. Casa Kolacho also runs Grafitours, which address the history, politics, and art of Comuna 13.

=== Tourism ===
Casa Kolacho as well as other programs run locally-led graffiti tours of the neighborhood. Comuna 13 is one of the most visited tourist sites in all of Medellín. Tourists come from all over the world to see the story of resilience that Comuna 13 provides. Stands fueled by the flow of tourism line the streets selling art, merchandise, accessories, food, drinks, and clothes.

Residents of the neighborhoods Plan del Che, Independencias I, II, and III live among the tourism sector, as these are the main areas of tourism in Comuna 13. It can get up to 6,000 visitors in a day on weekends, and it is one of the most, if not the most, visited areas of all of Medellín.

== Spanish page sources ==
1. «Víctimas entregaron informe sobre la Operación Orión al sistema integral de verdad, justicia y reparación». 16 de octubre de 2018. p. Agencia de Prensa IPC. Consultado el 6 de abril de 2020.
2. Anuario Estadístico de Medellín 2005
3. Estrato socioeconómico, Alcaldía de Medellín, Encuesta Calidad de Vida 2005.
4. Censo oficial DANE 2005, Perfiles Departamentos y Municipios.
5. www.elmundo.com. «Una comuna que ha escalado hasta la paz». www.elmundo.com. Consultado el 10 de febrero de 2021.
6. «Arte contra la maldición en la Comuna 13 de Medellín». La Vanguardia. 12 de octubre de 2019. Consultado el 10 de febrero de 2021.
7. Hierro, Lola (30 June 2016). "Casa Kolacho: La violencia se cura con hip hop" [Casa Kolacho: Violence is cured with hip hop]. El País (in Spanish).
8. Zapata, Gustavo Ospina (14 de noviembre de 2019). «UVA Huellas de Vida, nuevo espacio de integración en la comuna 13». www.elcolombiano.com. Consultado el 10 de febrero de 2021.
9. «Medellín, Ciudad de la eterna primavera: Pantalla de agua de la comuna 13(San Javier):». Medellín, Ciudad de la eterna primavera. Consultado el 10 de febrero de 2021.
10. Tiempo, Casa Editorial El (10 de enero de 2021). «El Ecoparque que construyeron junto a una fosa común en Medellín». El Tiempo. Consultado el 10 de febrero de 2021.
11. «En noviembre sería entregada la Ciudadela Universitaria de Occidente». Telemedellín. 23 de agosto de 2020. Consultado el 10 de febrero de 2021.
