= La Iguana Bridge =

Pedestrian bridge in Puerto Vallarta, Jalisco, Mexico

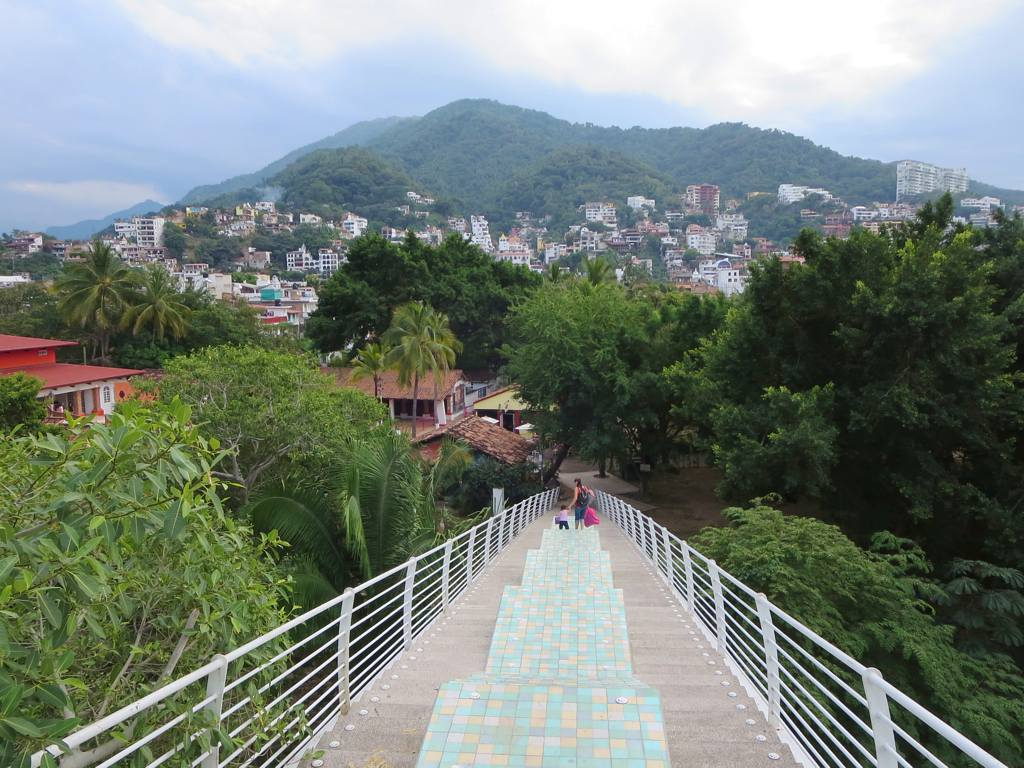
- The bridge in 2014
- Coordinates: 20.6064°N 105.2328°W
- Locale: Puerto Vallarta, Jalisco, Mexico

History
- Opened: 2012

Location
- Interactive map of La Iguana Bridge

La Iguana Bridge (Spanish: Puente de la Iguana) is a pedestrian bridge in Puerto Vallarta, in the Mexican state of Jalisco.

== Description and history ==
The bridge was completed in 2012 and connects Cuauhtémoc Street in Gringo Gulch, Centro, to Isla Cuale in Zona Romántica. The bridge was inspired by and named after the animal of the same name. The metallic handrails are painted white. The main steps are made of concrete and sand and in the middle there are steps that emerge and that are covered with green and yellow tiles.
