= Plaza San Martín, Córdoba =

Coordinates: 31°25′00″S 64°11′01″W

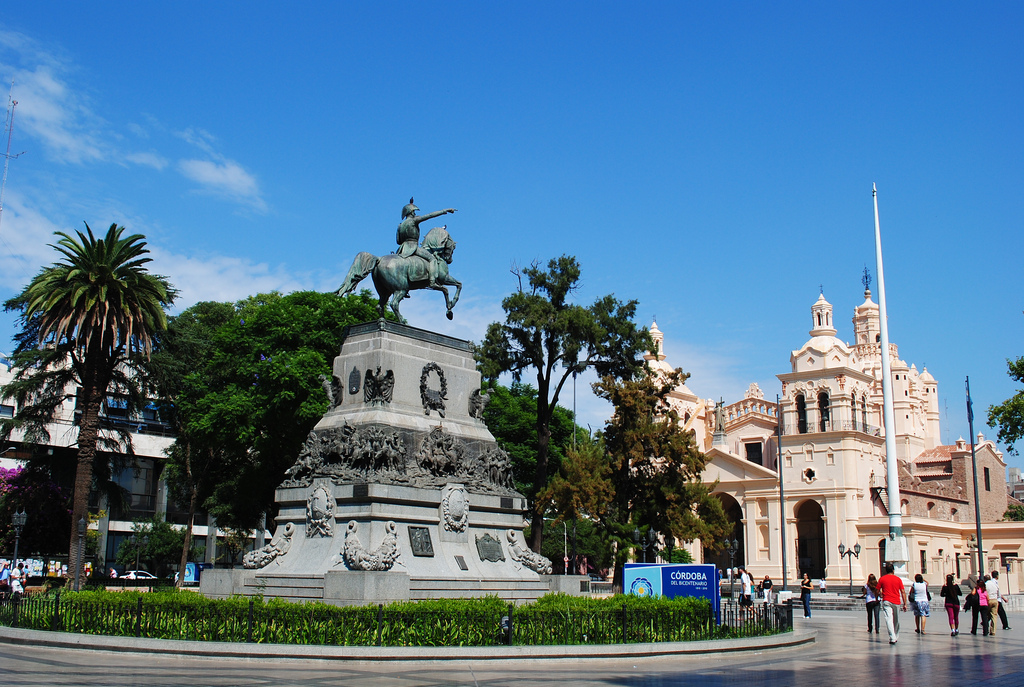
Panoramic view of Plaza San Martín, from a northeast angle. In the background, the Cathedral

Plaza San Martín (translatable into English as San Martín Square) is a green space located in the downtown of the Argentinian city of Córdoba.

Established in 1577, during the colonial era it was the place where fairs and patron saint or civic festivals and even bullfights were held.

In 1901, the Franco-Argentinian landscape designer Carlos León Thays designed the landscaping with several species of plants.

Since 1916, José de San Martín, the Argentinian liberator, has had a bronze equestrian monument that sits on a base decorated with bronze bas-reliefs that remember the liberation campaigns.

Plaza San Martín has a valuable building environment in which buildings from the time of the Spanish colonial era (like the Cathedral and the Cabildo) stand out, as well as buildings from the 19th and 20th centuries.
