= Versalles (disambiguation) =

Versalles may refer to:

== Place name ==
- Versalles, a town and municipality located in the Department of Valle del Cauca, Colombia.
- Versalles, Buenos Aires, a barrio (district) of Buenos Aires, Argentina.
- Versalles, Puerto Vallarta, a colonia (or neighborhood) in Puerto Vallarta, in the Mexican state of Jalisco.

== Family name ==
- Zoilo Versalles (1939-1995), a Cuban professional baseball player, who played in the United States.

== See also ==
- Chacarita Versalles, a Peruvian football club, playing in the city of Iquitos, Loreto, Peru.
