= Conchas Chinas =

Colonia in Jalisco, Mexico

- Colonia

- Location within Mexico
- Coordinates: 20°35′19″N 105°14′32″W
- Country: Mexico
- State: Jalisco

Conchas Chinas is an affluent colonia directly south of Puerto Vallarta in the state of Jalisco, on the Pacific coast of Mexico. The term Conchas Chinas means "Curled Shells" referring to the type of shell found only on the beaches of Conchas Chinas. Locals in Puerto Vallarta refer to Conchas Chinas as "The Hills" (as in 'the Beverly Hills of Puerto Vallarta'). There are many gated communities perched high on the mountainsides directly on the bay, with many million-dollar homes owned by internationally known celebrities and politicians.

== Resorts ==
Puerto Vallarta, and specifically Conchas Chinas, are resort destinations. The following resorts are located in Conchas Chinas:

- Casa Aventura
- Casa Isabel
- Casa Mirador
- Grand Miramar Club and Spa
- Garza Blanca
- Howard Johnson's Hotel
- Hyatt Ziva
- Lindo Mar
- Playa Fiesta
- Puerto Vallarta Beach Club

== Developments ==
-Carmelina

-Orchid

== See also ==
- Playa Conchas Chinas
