= Pitillal =

Neighborhood in Puerto Vallarta, Jalisco, Mexico

- Neighborhood
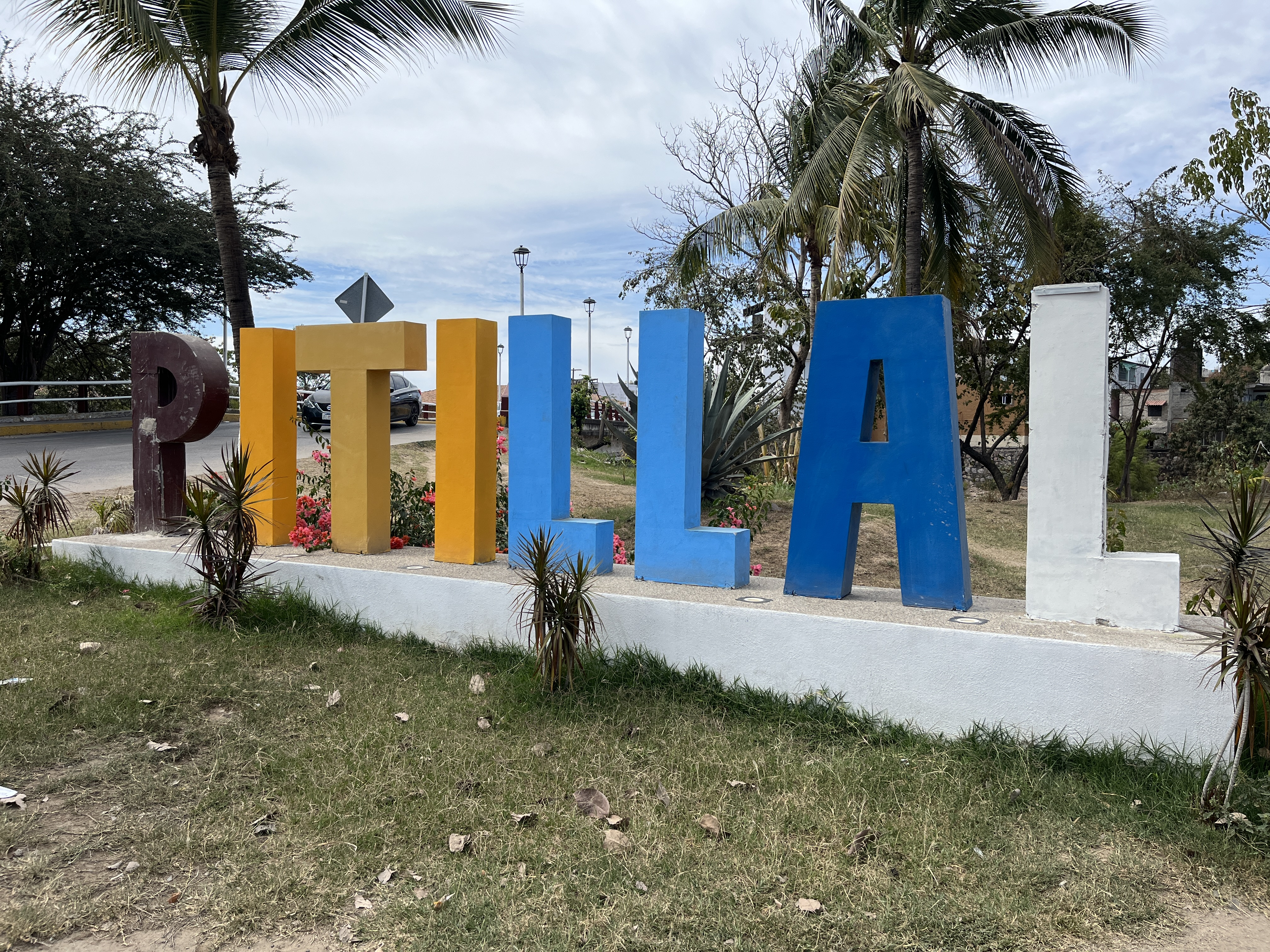
- Sign at an entrance to the neighborhood, 2023

- Location within Mexico
- Coordinates: 20°39′11″N 105°13′05″W
- Country: Mexico
- State: Jalisco

Population (2020)
  - Total: 3,174

Pitillal (or El Pitillal) is a neighborhood in Puerto Vallarta, in the Mexican state of Jalisco.

Puerto Vallarta grew around the town, which was founded in 1872.

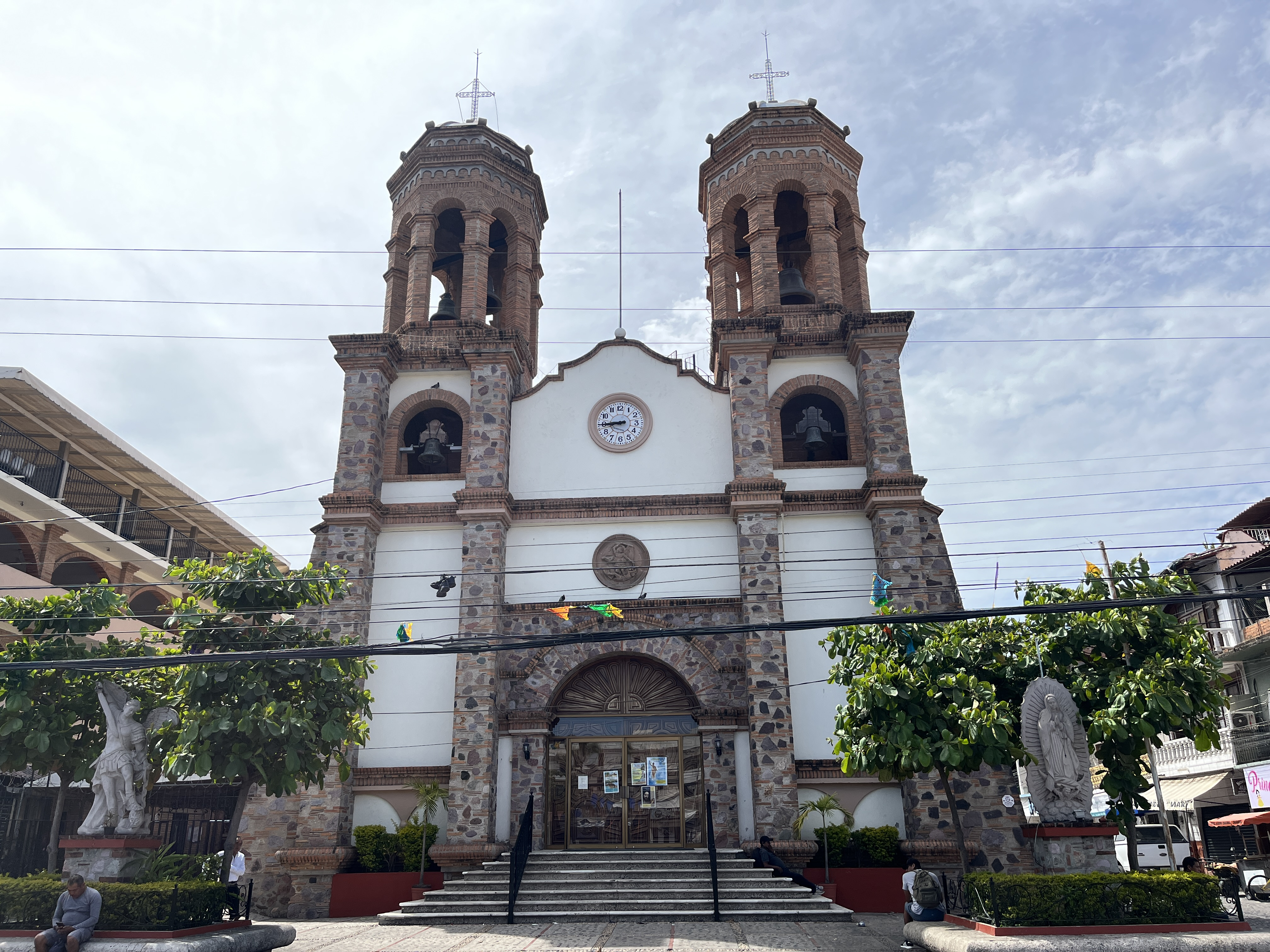
Church exterior, 2023

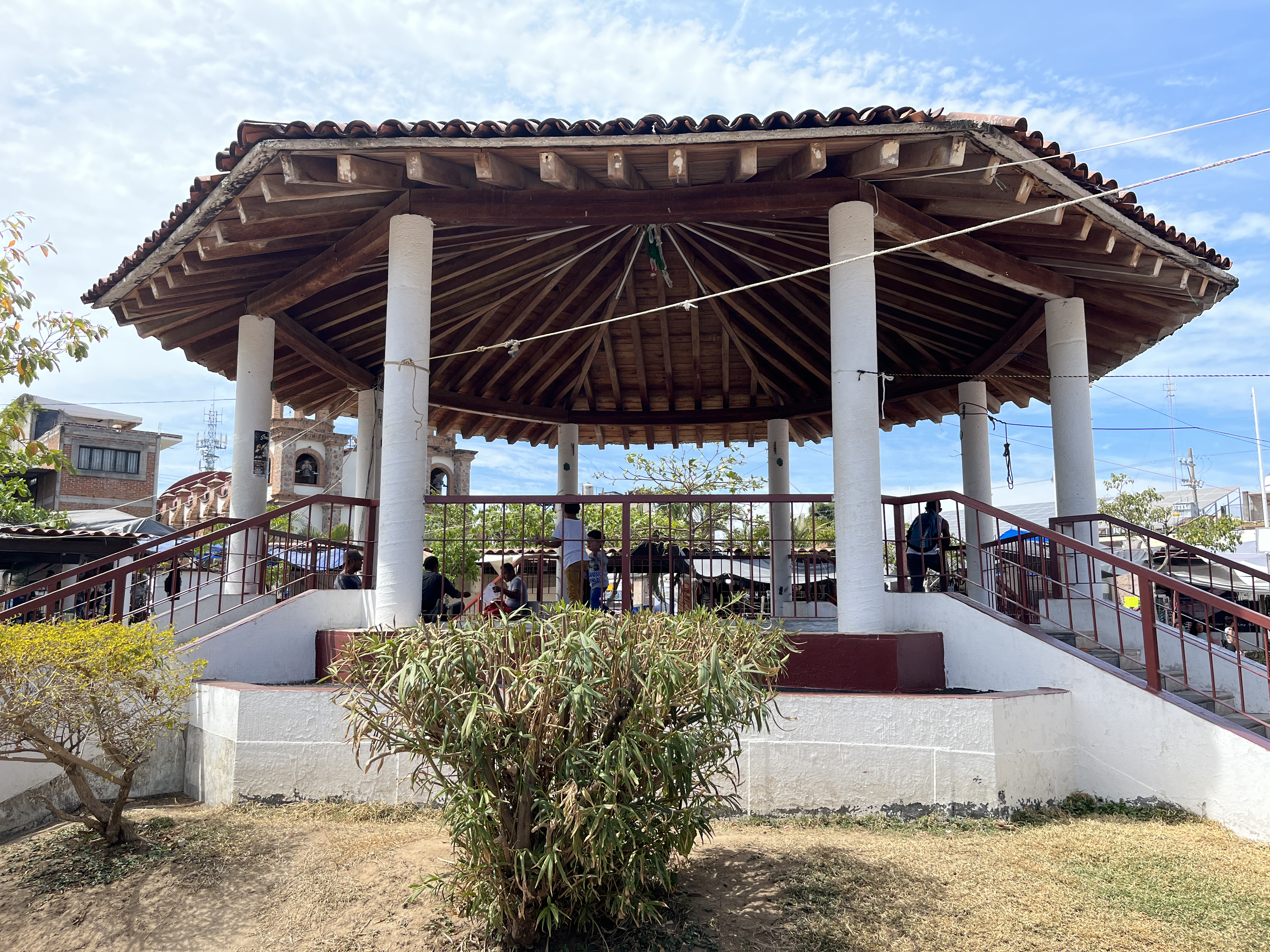
Bandstand in the plaza
