= Puerto Vallarta =

City in Jalisco, Mexico

- City and municipality
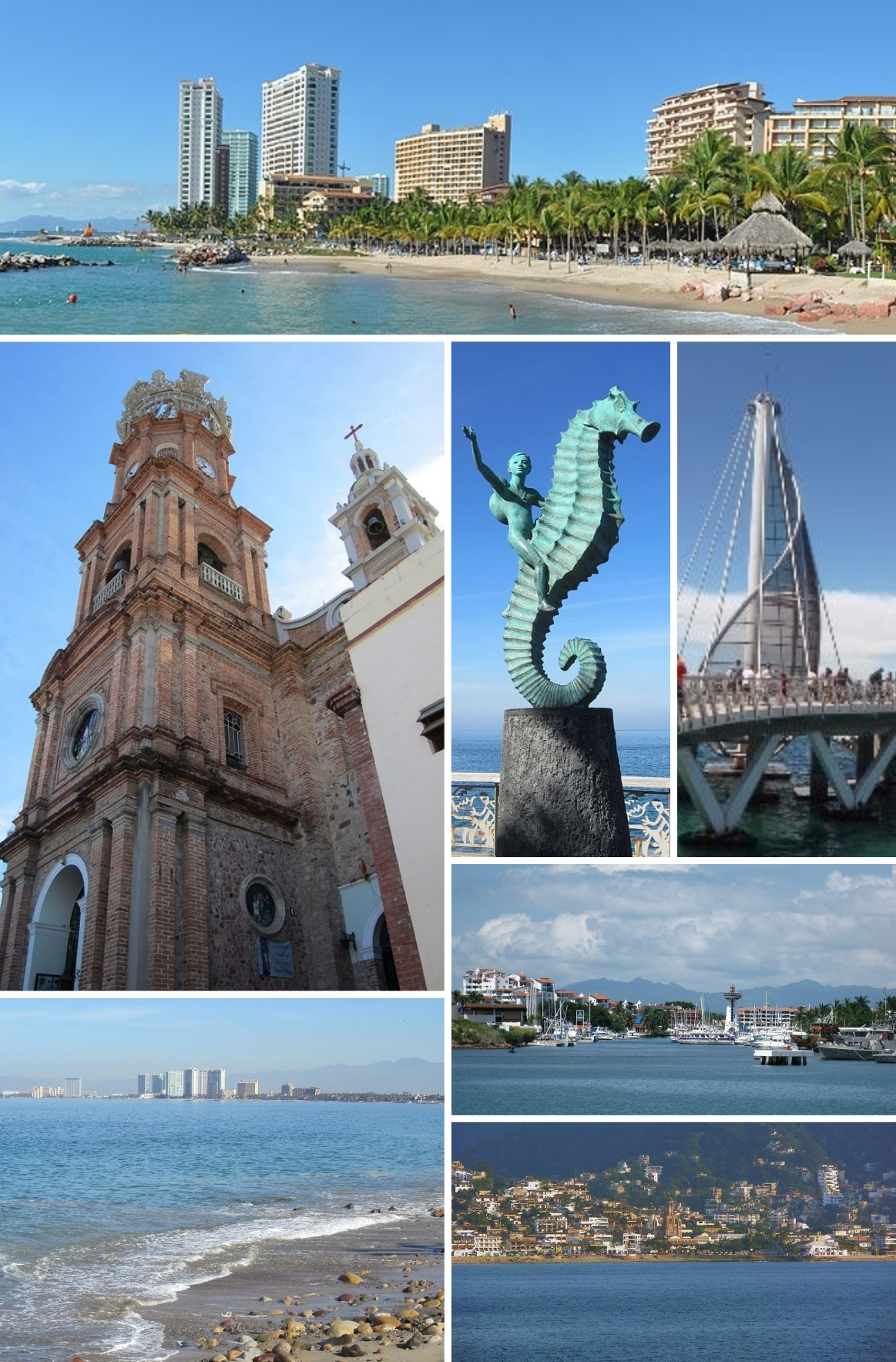
- Above, from left to right: Panoramic view of Villa del Palmar, Our Lady of Guadalupe Parish, the Sea Horse Sculpture, the pier, view of the hotel zone from the boardwalk, Marina Vallarta and downtown.

- Flag Coat of arms Logo
- Nicknames: P.V., Vallarta
- Location of the municipality within the state of Jalisco

- Location within Mexico Location within Jalisco
- Coordinates: 20°38′45″N 105°13′20″W
- Country: Mexico
- State: Jalisco
- Founded: December 12, 1851
- Founded as: Las Peñas
- Named for: Ignacio Vallarta

Government
  - Municipal president: Luis Ernesto Munguía González ( PVEM)

Area
  - Total: 49.11 km^{2} (18.96 sq mi)
  - Municipality: 680.9 km^{2} (262.9 sq mi)
  - Metro: 1,452 km^{2} (561 sq mi)
- Elevation: 7.0 m (23 ft)

Population (2020)
  - Total: 224,166
  - Rank: 6th in Jalisco
  - Density: 4,565/km^{2} (11,820/sq mi)
  - Municipality: 291,839
  - Metro: 479,471
- Demonym: Vallartense
- Time zone: UTC−06:00 (Zona Centro)
- Postal code: 48300
- Area code: +52 322
- Website: puertovallarta.gob.mx

Puerto Vallarta (Spanish pronunciation: [ˈpweɾto βaˈʎaɾta] or simply Vallarta) is a Mexican resort city on Bahía de Banderas of the Pacific coast of the Mexican state of Jalisco. Puerto Vallarta is the second largest urban agglomeration in the state after the Guadalajara metropolitan area. The city of Puerto Vallarta is the government seat of the municipality of Puerto Vallarta, which comprises the city as well as population centers outside of the city, extending from Boca de Tomatlán to the Nayarit border (the Ameca River). The city is located at 20°40′N 105°16′W. The municipality has an area of 681 square kilometres (262.9 sq mi). To the north, it borders the southwest of the state of Nayarit. To the east, it borders the municipality of Mascota and San Sebastián del Oeste, and to the south, it borders the municipalities of Talpa de Allende and Cabo Corrientes.

Puerto Vallarta is named after Ignacio Vallarta, a former governor of Jalisco. In Spanish, Puerto Vallarta is frequently shortened to "Vallarta", while English speakers call the city P.V. for short. In Internet shorthand, the city is often referred to as PVR, after the International Air Transport Association airport code for its Gustavo Diaz Ordaz International Airport.

== History ==
=== Bahía de Banderas (Bay of Flags) ===
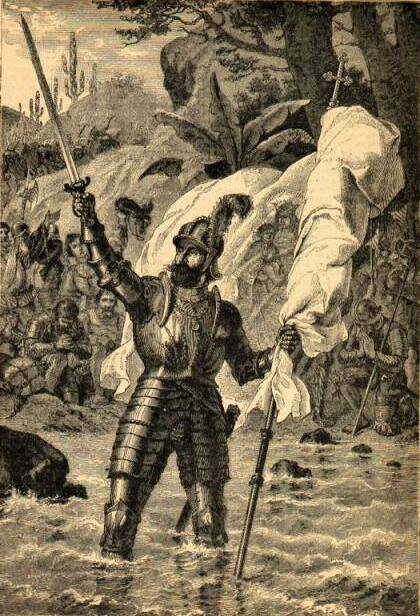
Vasco Núñez de Balboa was the first European to discover the Pacific Ocean. Balboa is believed to have later worked as a pirate along the Pacific central coast of Mexico in 1518-19 and is likely the first European to discover the village of Tintoque.

Pirates were known to sack villages and attack ships along the Pacific Coast of Mexico early in the 16th century. As early as 1510, rogue conquistadores and their slaves turned to piracy shortly after establishing the village of Santa María la Antigua del Darién, now in Panama. Just 50 miles west, they discovered the Pacific Ocean. To escape growing Spanish control in Darién, a contingent relocated to Acla. In 1518, they used the Pacific's Panama Bay as a base for pirating operations. Native tribes later attacked Darién and briefly retook control in 1524. Just two years earlier, a new group of rogue conquistadors established pirating operations on Terarequi Island in the Gulf of Panama and later Santo Domingo, Nicaragua.

In 1524, the nephew of Mexico's most famous Spanish conquistador, Hernán Cortés, led the first official Spanish exploration into the Tintoque region (now Valle de Banderas) on foot with a troop of soldiers. Upon entering the village, Francisco Cortés of San Buenaventura and his soldiers were surrounded by an angry mob of indigenous warriors carrying weapons. According to local legend, pirates had already been anchoring in this bay, pillaging local villagers, and burying treasure in the hills. These attacks instilled a fear of outsiders by local villagers. A Catholic friar accompanying the Spanish troops began praying to the Lord for help. The warriors immediately lowered their weapons, allowing the explorers to pass peacefully. According to reports, the warriors were mesmerized by the flags (banderas) the soldiers carried. The encounter with villagers is believed to be how the bay was named. In the following years, Bahía de Banderas became a major port and safe harbor for ships traveling the Manila galleon.

=== Playa de Los Muertos (Beach of the Dead) ===
In 1531, conquistador Hernán Cortés set out to explore the Pacific coast of Mexico and establish a safe harbor for cargo ships sailing the planned Manila Galleon Trade Route. He used the earlier established port of Acapulco to resupply his ships. While anchored in Acapulco, Cortés sent two of his ships North to explore the coastline without him. Just several hundred miles North, his ships located the large bay his nephew had discovered earlier. One of his ships wrecked in what is now known as Bahía de Banderas, and all but three men were reportedly killed. It is believed that the corpses of the lost sailors washed ashore. Native villagers encountered numerous corpses on the beach for days after the wreck. The encounters with the dead crew are believed to be how the beach was named.

=== Pre-Hispanic times to the 19th century ===
Few details are known about the history of the area prior to the 19th century. There is archaeological evidence to suggest continuous human habitation from 580 BC, and similar evidence (from sites near Ixtapa and in Col. Lázaro Cárdenas) that the area belonged to the Aztlán culture which dominated Jalisco, Nayarit and Michoacán from c. 900–1200. The limited evidence in occidental Mexican archeology have limited the current knowledge about pre-historic life in the area.

=== El Carrizal and Las Peñas – 19th century ===
The official founding story of Las Peñas and thus of Puerto Vallarta is that it was founded by Guadalupe Sánchez Torres, his wife Ambrosia Carrillo and some friends such as Cenobio Joya, Apolonio de Robles, Cleofas Peña and Martín Andrade, among others, on December 12, 1851, and was given the name of Las Peñas de Santa María de Guadalupe since it was the day dedicated to the virgin of Guadalupe. Although the purchase record of the property by Guadalupe Sanchez is dated 1859, his family lived there prior to the purchase year.

There is however no doubt the development of Las Peñas into a self-sustaining village of any significant size happened in the 1860s as the mouth of the Cuale area was exploited to support the operations of the newly enfranchised Union en Cuale company. As such 1859 marks the beginning of Puerto Vallarta as a village. Twenty years later, by 1885, the village comprised about 250 homes and about 800 residents.

=== The modern resort – 20th century to present ===
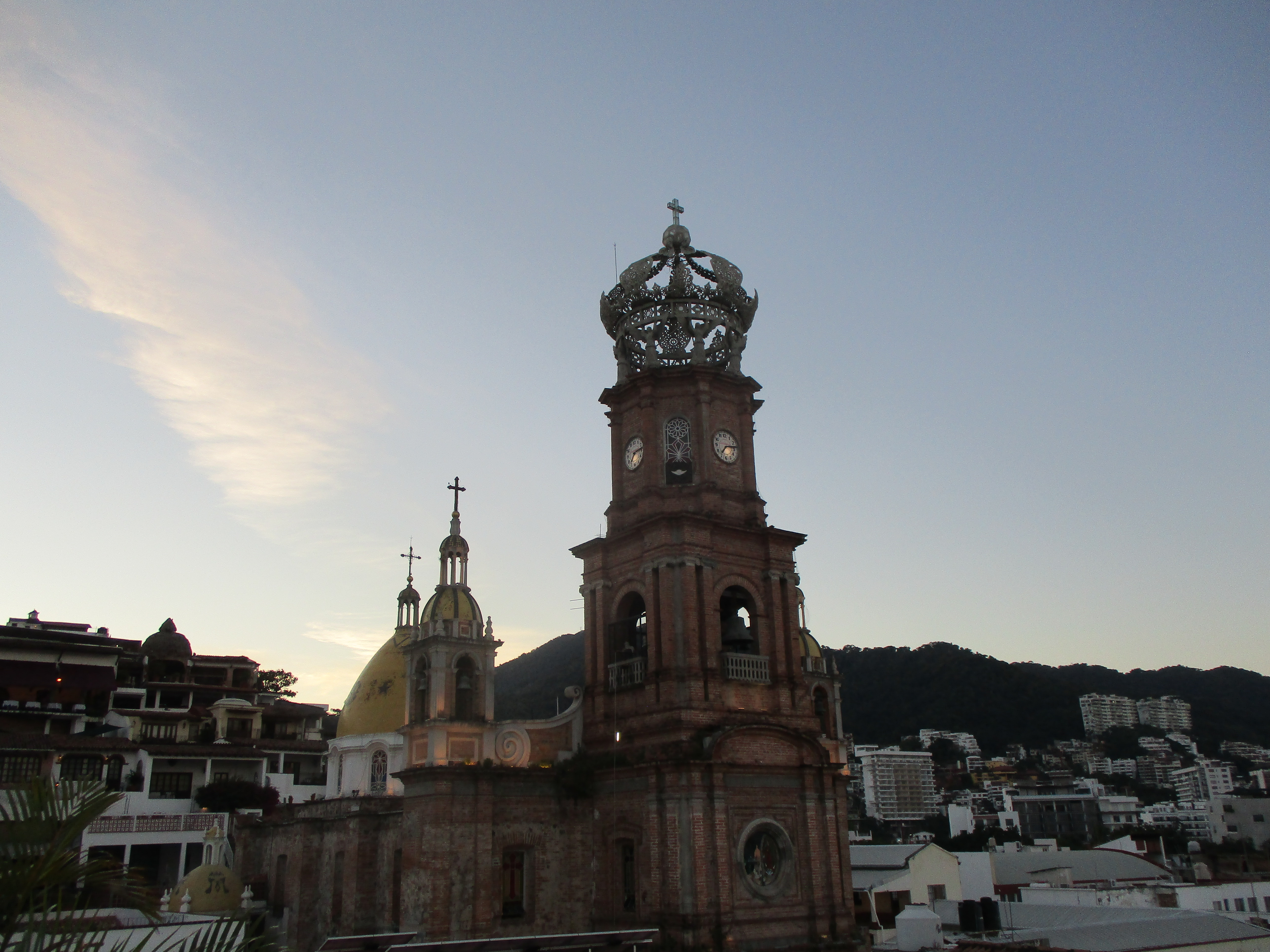
Closer view of the church

The Mexican government invested significantly in transportation improvements, making Puerto Vallarta an easy travel destination. To make Puerto Vallarta accessible by jet aircraft the government developed the city's international airport. Ground transportation significantly improved. Government invested heavily in the development of highway and utility infrastructure. Another vital improvement for the city was the El Salado wharf (where the current cruise terminal is), inaugurated on June 1, 1970, making Puerto Vallarta Jalisco's first harbor town.

During the mid-1980s, Puerto Vallarta experienced a rapid expansion of impromptu communities poorly served by even basic public services. This very low standard of living leveled out Puerto Vallarta's resort boom. In the late 1980s Puerto Vallarta's government worked to alleviate the situation by developing housing and infrastructure. But the legacy of the 1980s boom remains, as the outlying areas of Puerto Vallarta suffer from poor provision of basic services (i.e. water, sewage, roads).

In February 2026, it was reported that Puerto Vallarta was most affected by retaliatory attacks which resulted from the death of Jalisco New Generation Cartel leader Nemesio Oseguera Cervantes, alias "El Mencho".

== Geography ==
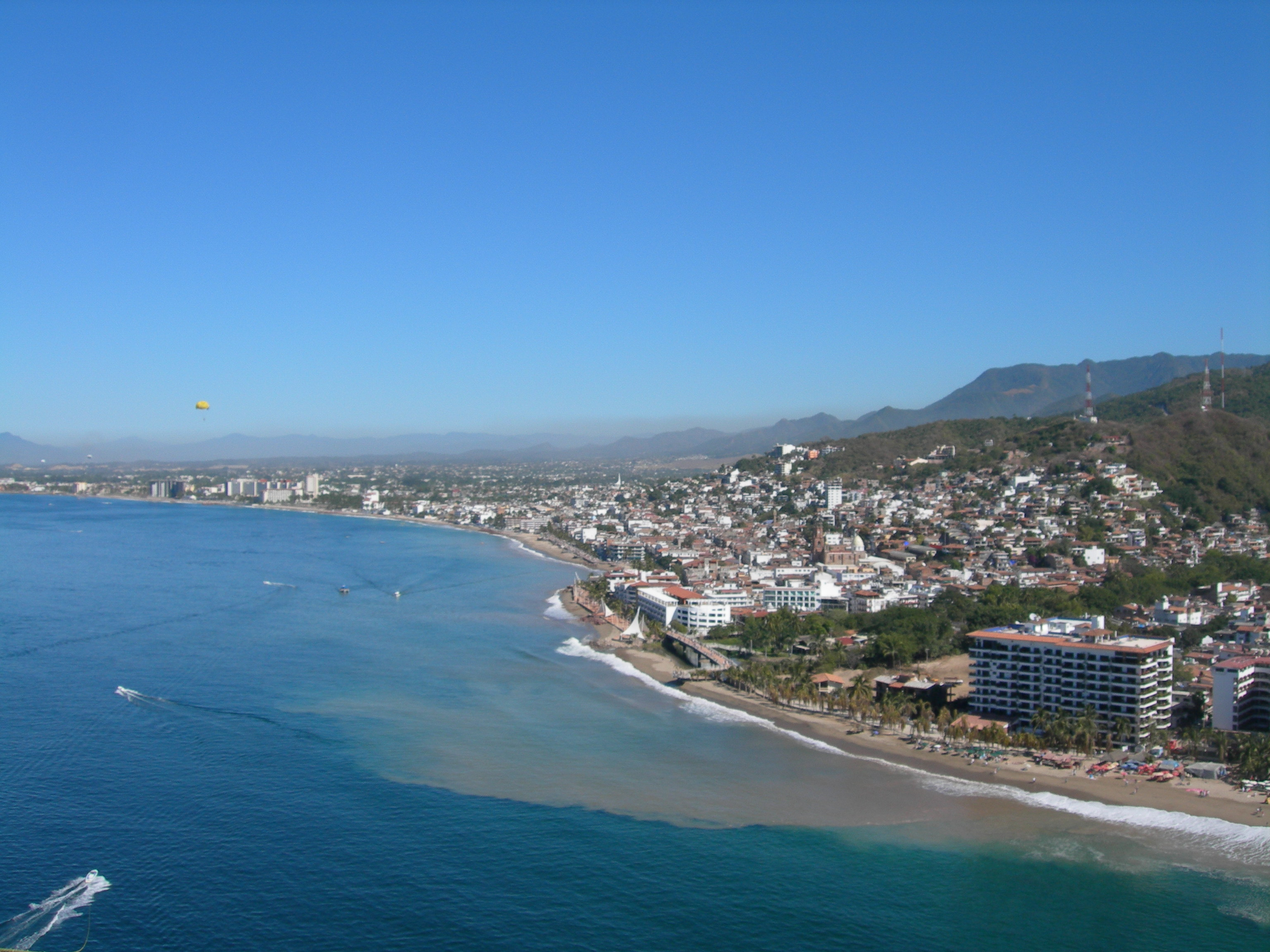
Beaches of Puerto Vallarta

Puerto Vallarta lies on a narrow coastal plain at the foot of the Sierras Cuale and San Sebastián, parts of the Sierra Madre Occidental. The plain widens to the north, reaching its widest point along the Ameca river. Three rivers flow from the Sierra through the area. From south to north they are the Cuale, the Pitillal, and the Ameca. A number of arroyos also run from the Sierra to the coastal plain. Many of the valleys of these rivers and arroyos are inhabited. Also development has to some extent spread up the hillsides from the coastal plain.

The city proper comprises four main areas: the hotel zone along the shore to the north, Olas Altas – Colonia Emiliano Zapata to the south of the Cuale river (recently named Zona Romántica in some tourist brochures), the Centro along the shore between these two areas, and a number of residential areas to the east of the hotel zone. The oldest section of the town is the area of Col. Centro near the church of Our Lady of Guadalupe, especially Hidalgo street.

=== Seismic history ===
Puerto Vallarta, like much of the west coast of North America, is prone to earthquakes, though Puerto Vallarta tends to experience only peripheral effects of earthquakes centered farther south. On 9 October 1995, an earthquake located off the Colima coast shook the crown from the top of the Roman Catholic Church.

=== Climate ===
Puerto Vallarta has a Tropical wet and dry climate (Köppen climate classification Aw), with dry winters and rainy summers. The average daily high temperature is 86 °F (30 °C); average daily low temperature is 70 °F (21 °C); average daily humidity is 75%. The rainy season extends from mid June through mid October, with most of the rain between July and September. August is the city's wettest month, with an average of 14 days with significant precipitation. Even during the rainy season precipitation tends to be concentrated in large rainstorms. Occasional tropical storms will bring thunderstorms to the city in November, though the month is typically dry. There is a marked dry season in the winter. February, March and April are the months with the least cloud cover.

Hurricanes seldom strike Puerto Vallarta. In 2002, Hurricane Kenna, a category 5 hurricane, made landfall about 160 km (100 mi) northwest of Puerto Vallarta, and the city suffered some damage from the resulting storm surge. In 1971, Hurricane Lily, a category 1 hurricane, caused serious flooding on the Isla Cuale, prompting the city to relocate all of its residents to the new Colonia Palo Seco.

Climate data for Puerto Vallarta, Jalisco, Mexico
Month	Jan	Feb	Mar	Apr	May	Jun	Jul	Aug	Sep	Oct	Nov	Dec	Year
Record high °C (°F)	35.0 (95.0)	35.0 (95.0)	36.0 (96.8)	36.0 (96.8)	43.5 (110.3)	45.0 (113.0)	45.0 (113.0)	39.0 (102.2)	38.0 (100.4)	39.0 (102.2)	37.0 (98.6)	36.0 (96.8)	45.0 (113.0)
Mean daily maximum °C (°F)	26.7 (80.1)	26.7 (80.1)	27.2 (81.0)	27.8 (82.0)	29.4 (84.9)	31.7 (89.1)	32.2 (90.0)	32.2 (90.0)	32.2 (90.0)	31.7 (89.1)	30.0 (86.0)	27.8 (82.0)	29.6 (85.4)
Daily mean °C (°F)	21.7 (71.1)	21.7 (71.1)	22.2 (72.0)	23.6 (74.5)	25.6 (78.1)	28.3 (82.9)	28.6 (83.5)	28.3 (82.9)	28.3 (82.9)	27.8 (82.0)	25.3 (77.5)	22.8 (73.0)	25.4 (77.6)
Mean daily minimum °C (°F)	16.7 (62.1)	16.7 (62.1)	17.2 (63.0)	18.9 (66.0)	21.7 (71.1)	25.0 (77.0)	25.0 (77.0)	24.4 (75.9)	24.4 (75.9)	23.9 (75.0)	20.6 (69.1)	17.8 (64.0)	21.0 (69.9)
Record low °C (°F)	11 (52)	8 (46)	12 (54)	11 (52)	11 (52)	17 (63)	21 (70)	21 (70)	18 (64)	16 (61)	13 (55)	7 (45)	7 (45)
Average rainfall mm (inches)	33.8 (1.33)	5.3 (0.21)	2.0 (0.08)	1.5 (0.06)	15.4 (0.61)	187.6 (7.39)	328.1 (12.92)	312.4 (12.30)	370.0 (14.57)	93.8 (3.69)	19.8 (0.78)	22.5 (0.89)	1,392.2 (54.83)
Average rainy days (≥ 0.1 mm)	2.2	0.7	0.6	0.2	1.0	10.8	16.4	15.2	15.6	5.1	1.4	1.9	71.1
Average relative humidity (%)	67	65	65	67	68	69	69	70	70	68	67	68	68
Source 1: World Meteorological Organization.
Source 2: Weatherbase

Puerto Vallarta mean sea temperature
Jan	Feb	Mar	Apr	May	Jun	Jul	Aug	Sep	Oct	Nov	Dec
24 °C (75 °F)	24 °C (75 °F)	24 °C (75 °F)	25 °C (77 °F)	27 °C (81 °F)	28 °C (82 °F)	29 °C (84 °F)	30 °C (86 °F)	30 °C (86 °F)	30 °C (86 °F)	28 °C (82 °F)	25 °C (77 °F)

=== Hurricane Patricia ===
Hurricane Patricia, a Category 5 storm, became the most powerful cyclone ever measured in the Western Hemisphere with sustained wind speeds up to 200 mph (320 km/h). Hurricane Patricia was forecast to make landfall at Puerto Vallarta on the evening of October 23, 2015, with catastrophic damage predicted for the town and surrounding areas and the potential for mud slides. The storm changed from a Category 1 to a Category 5 in just 24 hours, thus catching some vacationers off guard and leaving many trapped in the town. The Jalisco state government put together 30 buses to evacuate tourists from the coast to Guadalajara, a 5-hour ride inland. Manzanillo, Colima was also near the forecast catastrophic damage zone. Ultimately, Patricia weakened and made landfall south of Puerto Vallarta, sparing the city from any significant damage.

== Demographics ==
Historical population
Year	Pop.	±%
1995	196,000	—
2000	183,741	−6.3%
2005	220,368	+19.9%
2010	255,681	+16.0%
2015	275,640	+7.8%
2020	291,893	+5.9%

As of 2020, Puerto Vallarta had a population of 291,893 inhabitants in the municipality, being the sixth biggest municipality in Jalisco in terms of population, and the biggest outside Guadalajara Metropolitan Area.

There are over 100 localities, nearly 75 % reside in the Municipal seat, Puerto Vallarta (224,166 habs.). Other localities include Ixtapa (39,083 habs.), Las Juntas (10,242 habs.), Las Palmas de Arriba (3,939 habs.) and Ecoterra Paraíso (2,108 habs.).

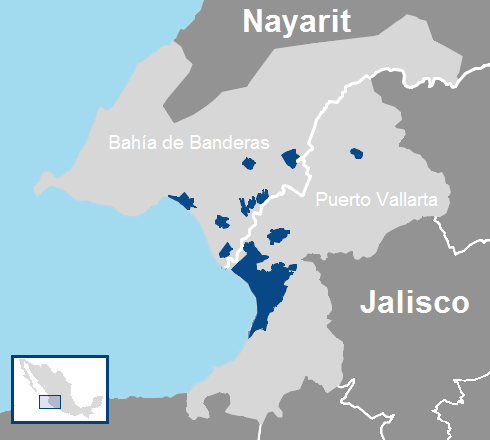
Puerto Vallarta metropolitan area

Puerto Vallarta alongside Bahía de Banderas Municipality in the state of Nayarit (187,632 habs. as 2020) forms the interstate Puerto Vallarta Metropolitan Area. In 2020 the Metro Area had a population of 479,471 inhabitants.

== Economy ==
Nearly 80% of the workforce is employed in tourism-related industries: hotels, restaurants, personal services, and transportation.

=== Tourism trends ===
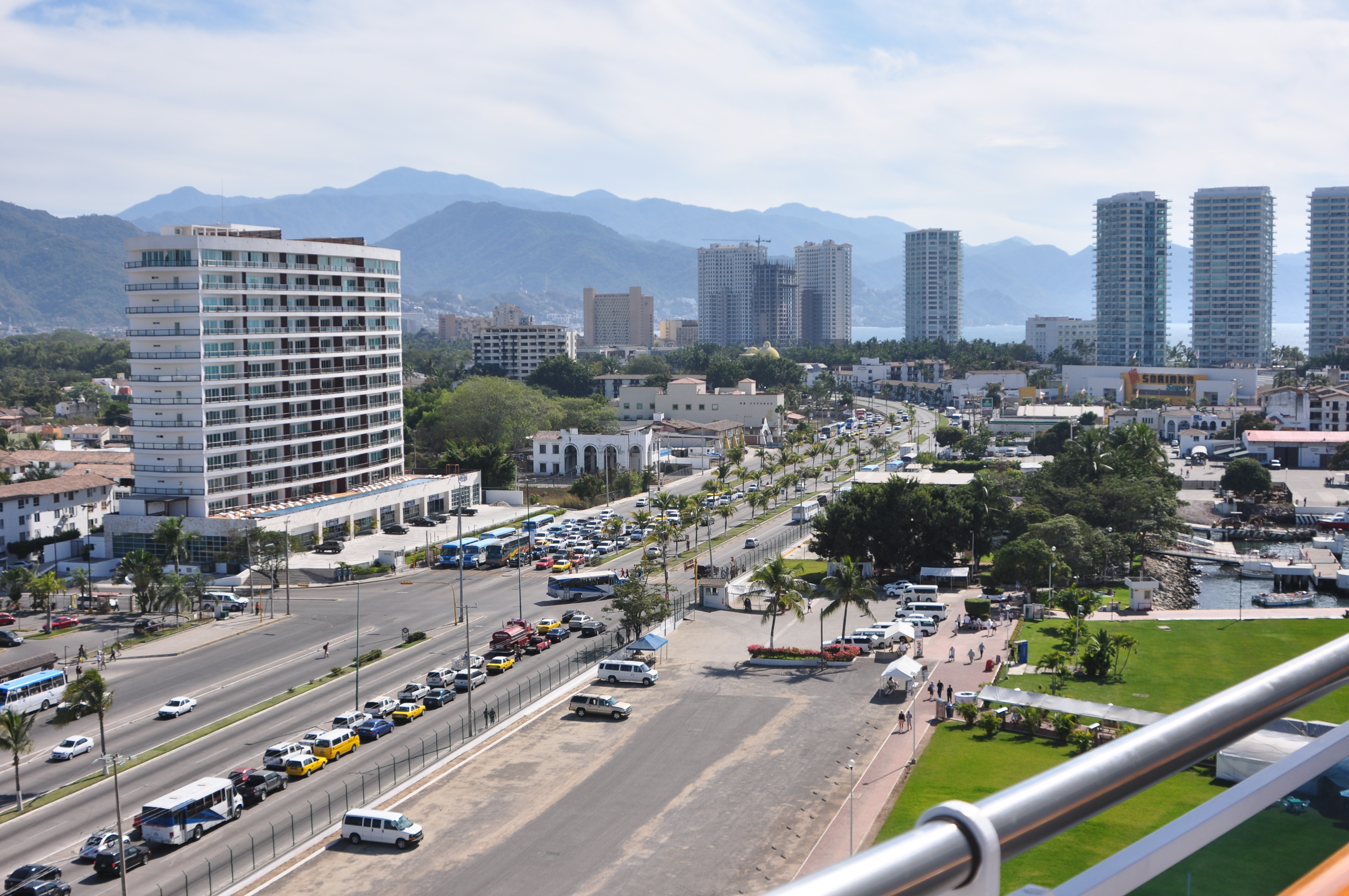
Puerto Vallarta Hotel Skyline

Tourism in Puerto Vallarta has increased steadily over the years and made up 80% of the city's economic activity in 2020. The high season for international tourism in Puerto Vallarta is from late November through March (or later, depending on the timing of the college spring break period in the U.S.) The city is especially popular with U.S. residents from the southern and western U.S. because of the number of direct flights between Puerto Vallarta and Atlanta, Los Angeles, San Francisco, Seattle, Portland, Denver, Phoenix, Dallas/Fort Worth, Houston, Minneapolis/St Paul and Chicago.

==== Real estate tourism ====
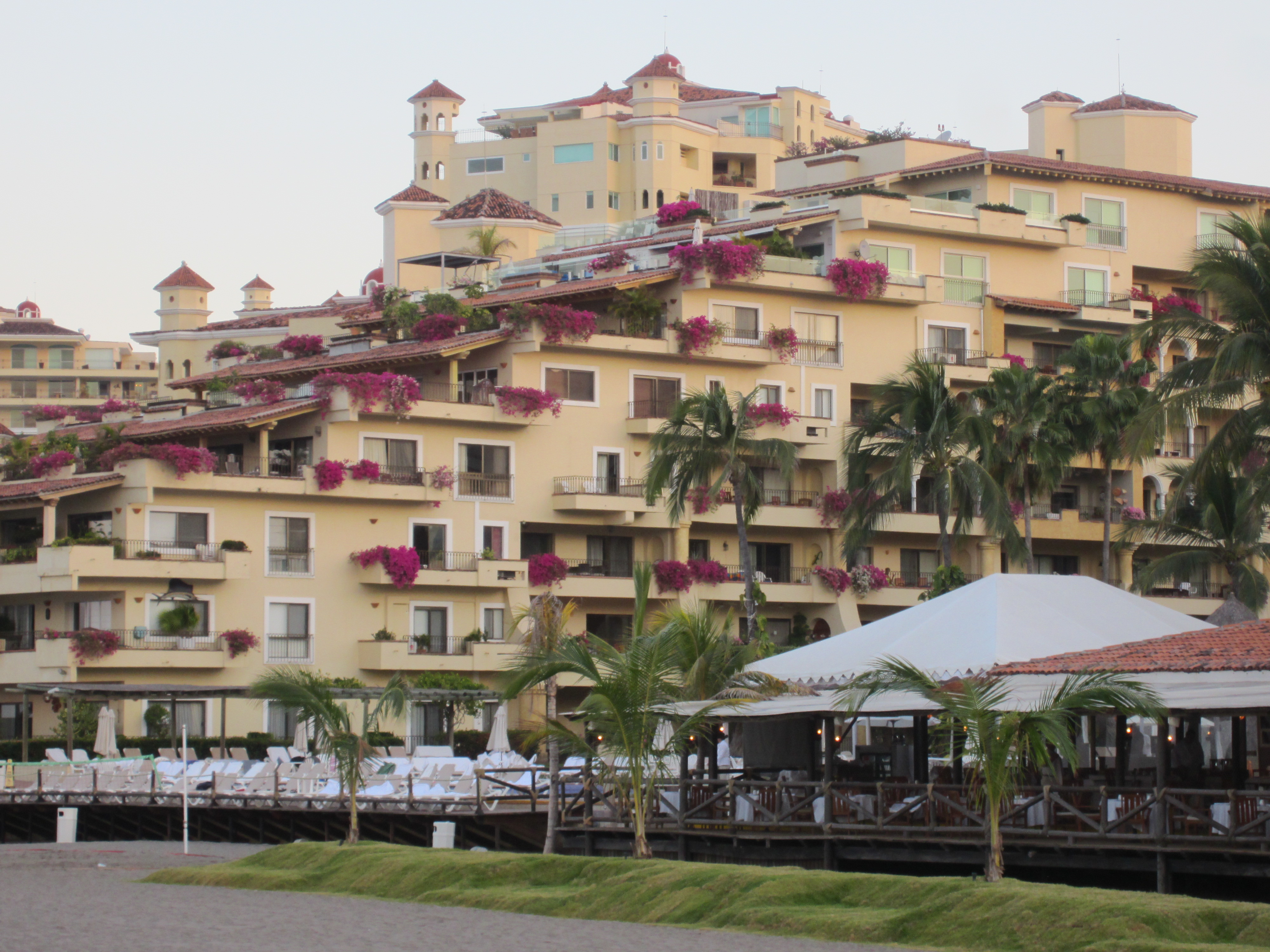
Velas Vallarta Hotel

Puerto Vallarta has become a popular retirement destination for U.S. and Canadian retirees. This has created a number of neighborhoods within the Puerto Vallarta region that cater primarily to real estate tourism, such as the Hotel Zone, which stretches from downtown Vallarta to the airport and Marina Vallarta (near the airport), and Amapas and Conchas Chinas, which are built into the mountain slightly south and behind Puerto Vallarta, and overlook the city and bay. Most recently the downtown area, especially in Emiliano Zapata (also known as the Romantic Zone), has seen a somewhat controversial trend of traditional homes being razed for the construction of condominium buildings. This region in recent years has been the most popular for Vallarta real estate tourism, with nearly 25% of all real estate sales for the region taking place there in 2019.

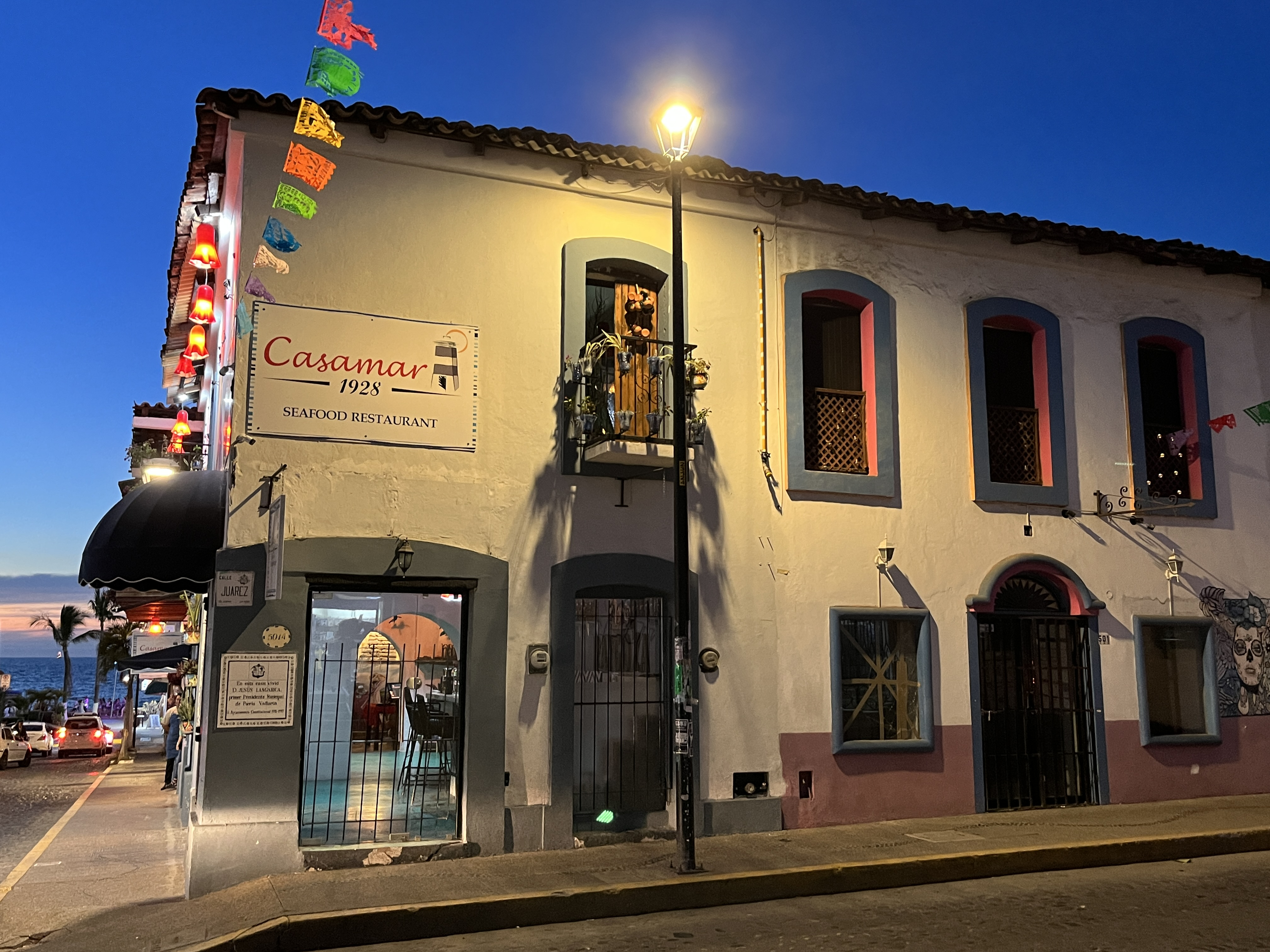
Restaurant at Puerto Vallarta's Downtown

The Puerto Vallarta real estate tourism market is made up of both full-time retirees and second-home owners, primarily from the United States. On average about 40% of buyers are American, with 30% consisting of Mexican nationals, and Canadians and other foreign buyers making up the remaining 20%. Mexicans favor destinations such as Puerto Vallarta, Los Cabos and Cancún not just for the sun and beach, but also as real estate investments, as real estate in these regions is priced in USD, rather than in pesos like the rest of the country.

Puerto Vallarta can be classified as a medium-ranged real estate market with a market consisting mostly of condominiums with an average price around US$320,000 in 2019. Any foreigner wishing to buy real estate in Puerto Vallarta (or anywhere along the coast of Mexico), can't own real estate there outright, but needs to establish a fideicommissum or beneficial trust which is held with a Mexican bank on the owner's behalf. It is not the same as holding the title. The trust is good for 50 years and can be renewed for another 50-year period.

==== LGBT tourism ====
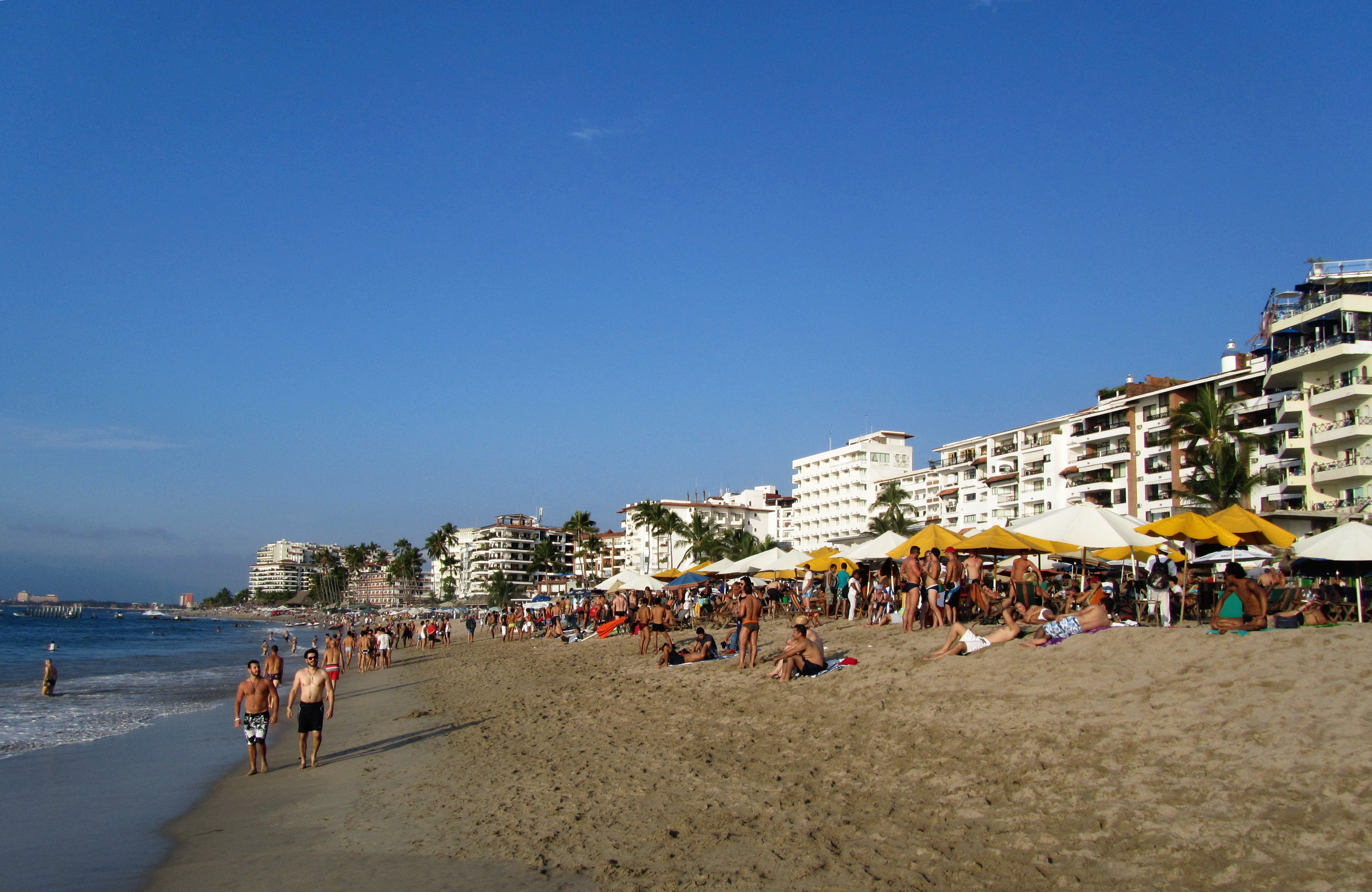
The LGBTQ portion of the Playa de Los Muertos (Beach of the Dead)

Puerto Vallarta has developed into Mexico's premier resort town as a sort of satellite gay space for the larger state capital, Guadalajara, much as Fire Island is to New York City and Palm Springs is to Los Angeles. It is now considered the most welcoming and gay-friendly destination in the country, dubbed the "San Francisco of Mexico." Previously quite conservative, the municipal government has become increasingly supportive in recognising and accepting the LGBTQ tourism segment and supporting LGBTQ events such as Vallarta gay pride celebrations, which launched in 2013 and are now held annually to coincide with U.S. Memorial Day weekend. It has a gay scene, centered in the city's south-side Zona Romántica, consisting of hotels and resorts as well as many bars, nightclubs and a gay beach on the main shore. Puerto Vallarta has been cited as the number one gay beach destination in Latin America, with city officials claiming a 5% tourism increase in 2013.

=== Population and growth rate for Puerto Vallarta ===
The major suburb is Bahia de Banderas in Nayarit across state lines, in which Nuevo Vallarta and Sayulita are localities. Ixtapa is a locality in PV, not to be confused with the municipality of Ixtapa in Guerrero state.

	1950	1960	1970	1980	1990	1995	2000	2005	2010	2015	2020
Locality					93,503	121,844	151,432	177,830	203,342	221,200	224,166
Municipality	10,801	15,462	35,911	57,028	111,457		184,728		255,725	275,640	291,839

=== Growth-related problems ===
Poverty remains a problem, fueled by the constant influx of persons seeking employment. Many areas of the city are still poorly served by roads and sewers. For example, Colonia Ramblases is served by roads in generally poor condition only 10% of which are paved, and Ramblases has been a populated neighborhood since the 1940s. The Municipality of Puerto Vallarta comprises about 45,000 regular dwellings. Of those, 10% do not have a potable water supply (carrying their water from a public tap), 8% do not have connections to a sewer system or septic system (using instead crude septic pits or dumping sewage directly into waterways), and 4% do not have electricity. There have been improvements in 2005 to 2007, such as new IMSS facilities in Col. Versalles, improvements to several recreation facilities, improved communal beach access policies, etc. Still efforts seem to aim more at quick and visible infrastructure improvements than at solving the more pressing and enduring problem of insufficient infrastructure for basic services.

One positive result of recent growth has been that in relative terms a smaller percentage of the population lives in older and poorly served neighborhoods. A growing number of residents live in housing projects and low-income housing developments which provide at least adequate basic services.

== Transportation ==
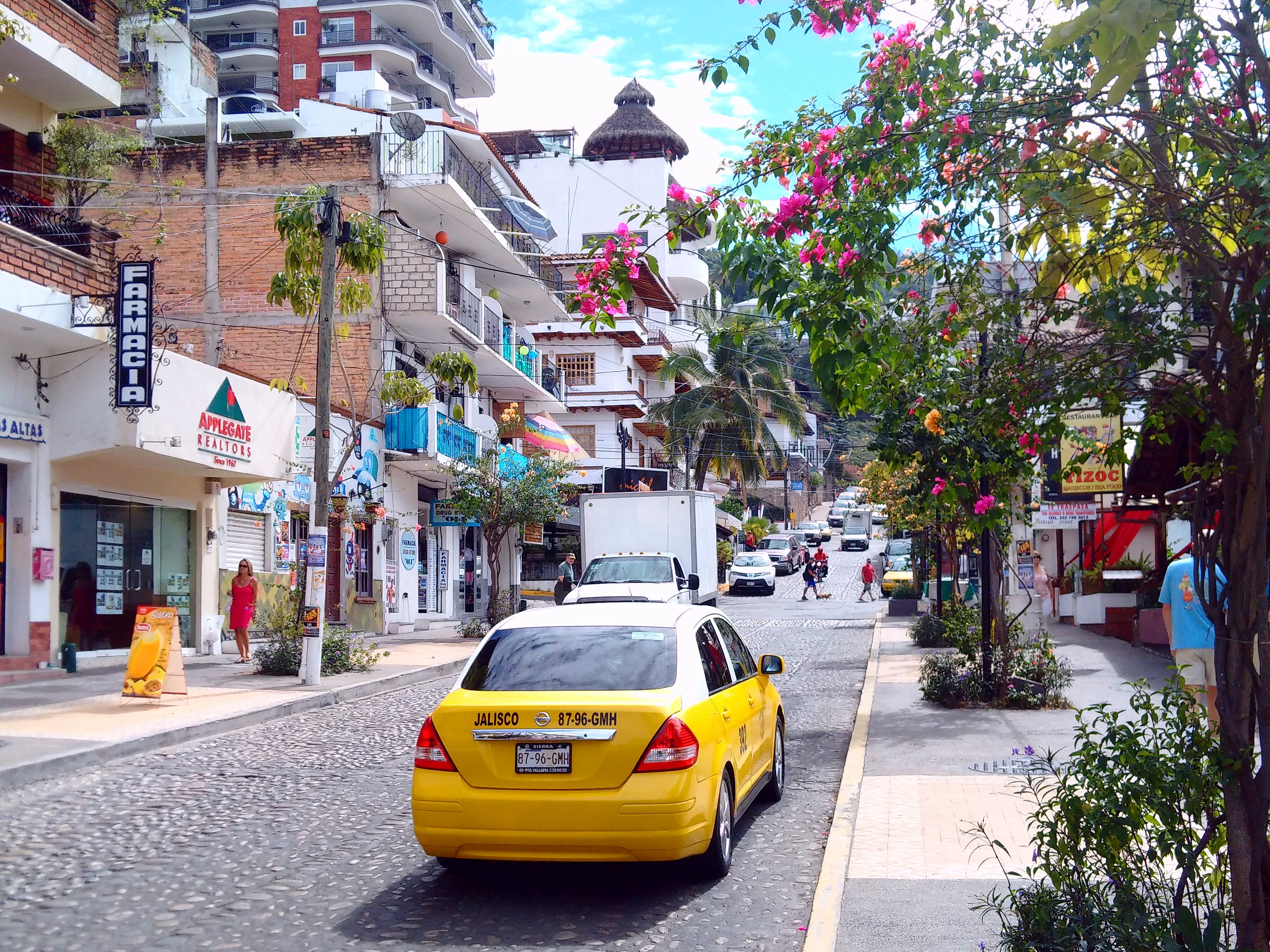
Taxi in downtown, driving on characteristic cobblestones

The Licenciado Gustavo Díaz Ordaz International Airport comprises a commercial international section and a general aviation section.

Puerto Vallarta currently has no passenger rail service. Historically, buses connected with nearby Tepic, where there was a passenger rail service on the main north–south trunk of Ferromex. Heading north, trains continued to Nogales, opposite its namesake in Arizona. A spur headed northwest to Mexicali, opposite Calexico, California. Service to the east went to Guadalajara and then to Mexico City.

As of June 2017, Uber began operating in Puerto Vallarta. Their arrival has not been without conflict, as there have been confrontations between them and taxi drivers due to their much lower rates.

== Film and television ==
- The Night of the Iguana (1963) was filmed on location at Mismaloya and other minor locations in the Puerto Vallarta area. The filming brought Richard Burton, Ava Gardner, Deborah Kerr, Tennessee Williams, and Elizabeth Taylor (who was not in the film). The off-screen activities of Burton and Taylor were reported in the tabloids and tabloid newsreels of the day. After filming was completed, Elizabeth Taylor and Richard Burton bought a house in Puerto Vallarta and visited the city regularly while they were married. John Huston decided to build a home in the vicinity, a home on remote Las Caletas beach and a house in town. John Huston's children Anjelica Huston and Danny Huston are founders and supporters of the Puerto Vallarta Film Festival (In the film, children are shown selling iguana meat by the roadside).
- The Love Boat, regularly featured Puerto Vallarta as a port of call for the fictional version of the Pacific Princess cruise ship.

== Landmarks, sights, activities ==
=== Landmarks in Puerto Vallarta ===
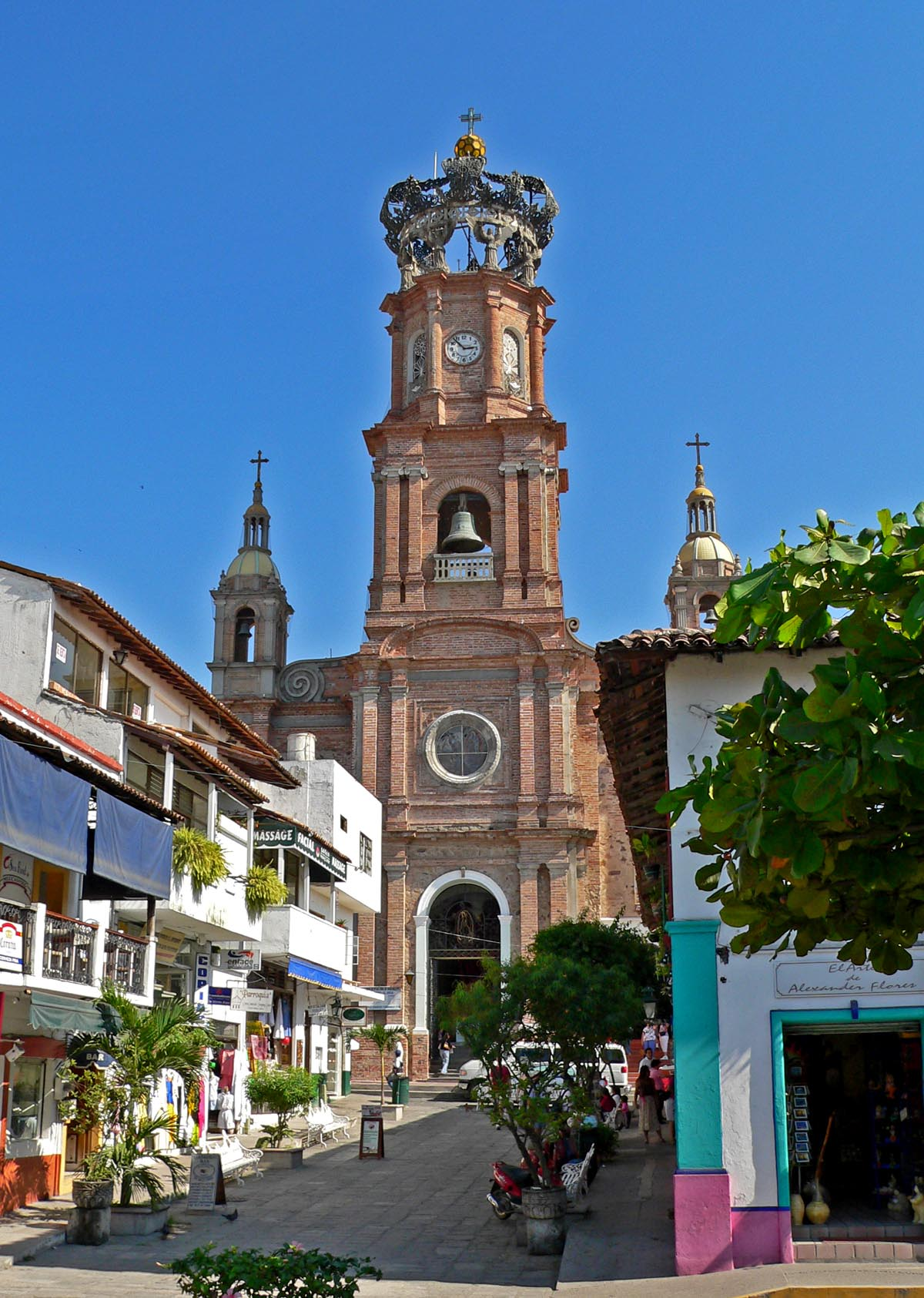
Church of Our Lady of Guadalupe

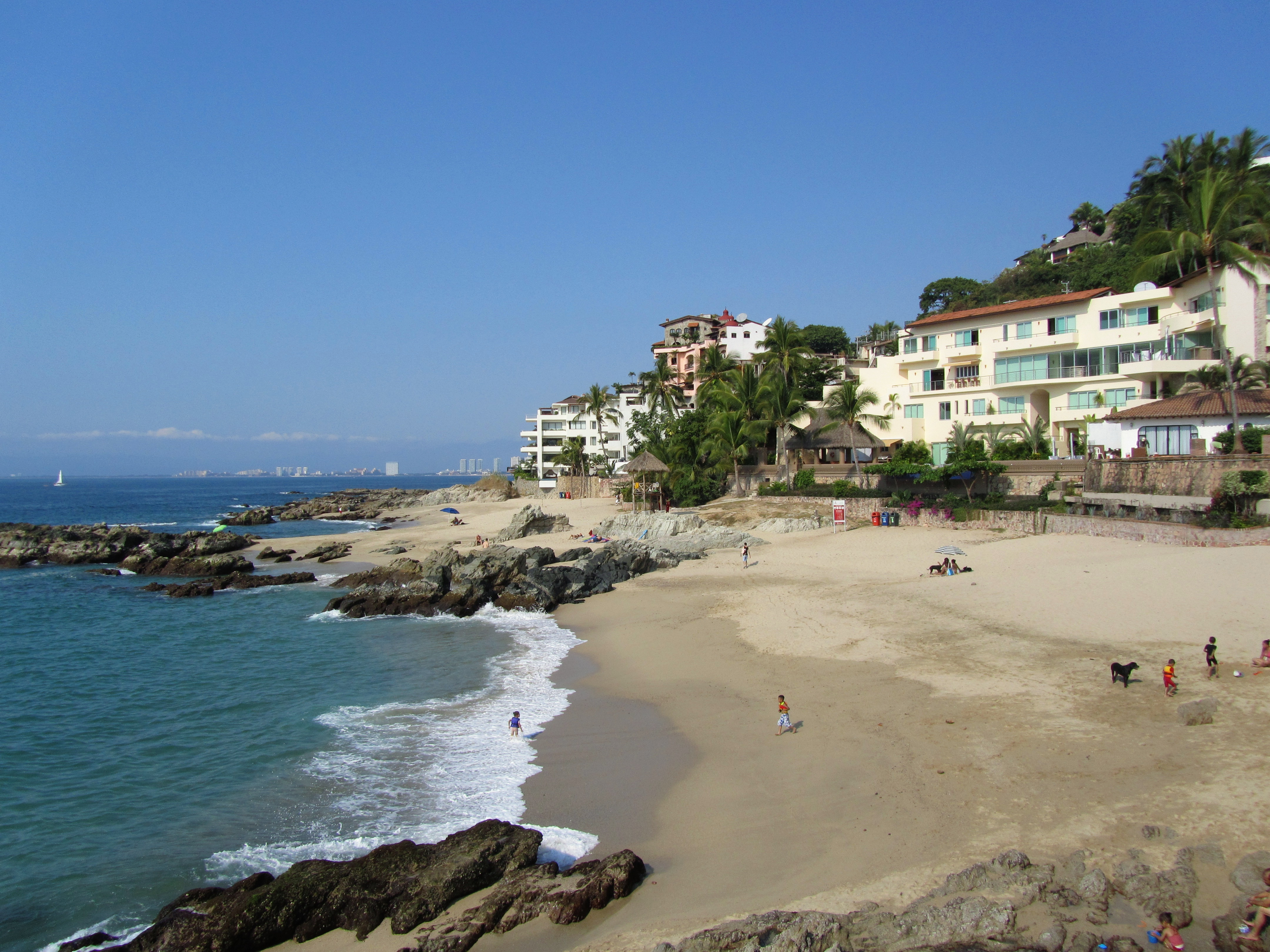
Playa Conchas Chinas

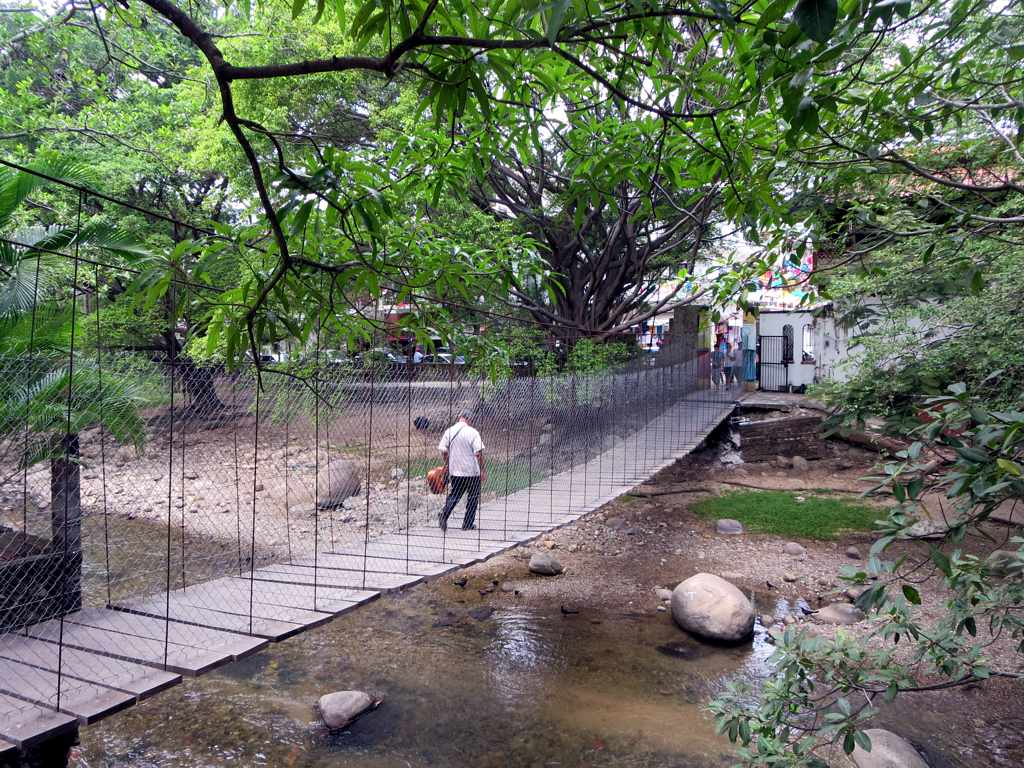
Isla del Río Cuale

- Church of Our Lady of Guadalupe – Colonia Centro
- Púlpito and Pilitas (Pulpit and Baptismal Font) – Colonia Emiliano Zapata – two rock formations at the South end of Los Muertos Beach. El Púlpito is the tall headland and Las Pilitas are the formation of rocks beneath it. Las Pilitas was the original location of the Boy on a Seahorse sculpture (El Caballito) now located on the Malecón, an identical sculpture is also located on Los Muertos Beach. There are two streets in the Olas Altas area named after the rock formations.
- Playa Conchas Chinas (Curly Shells Beach) – Fraccionamiento Amapas – the city's most secluded beach, located to the south of the headland which forms the boundary of Los Muertos beach.
- The Malecón – paved walkway along the seashore in Colonia Centro – especially popular during the Sunday evening paseo. It features a collection of contemporary sculptures by Sergio Bustamante, Alejandro Colunga, Ramiz Barquet and others. The Malecon was extensively rebuilt in 2002–2003 following damage from hurricane Kenna. It was also greatly renovated, having new walkways and iconic sculptures in 2010.
- Mercado Isle Cuale and Mercado Municipal Río Cuale – there are two large public markets in the Centro (Downtown) along the banks of the Cuale selling a variety of artisanal and souvenir goods, and the Isla Cuale has a number of souvenir vendor shops as well. The Isla Cuale was also famous for its cat population. The Island was a lower class suburb until flooding during Hurricane Lily (1971) forced residents to be relocated. They were moved to Palo Seco (which means "dry stick") and the Island was converted into a site for restaurants, shops and a cultural center.
- Cuale Archaeological Museum – on the West side of the Isla Cuale, the museum presents a significant collection of local and regional pre-Hispanic art in a number of informative displays. The museum also houses a small gallery for showing contemporary art.
- Statue of John Huston on Isla Cuale – dedicated on the 25th anniversary of the film's release and honoring Huston's contributions to the city. John's son Danny was married in a ceremony that took place at the statue in 2002.
- Plaza de Armas (Ignacio Vallarta) / Aquiles Serdán Amphitheater (Los Arcos) – the city's main plaza – site of public concerts both at the bandstand in the Plaza de Armas and on the stage in front of the arches across the street.
- City Hall – a modern city hall laid out using a traditional courtyard plan. There is a tourist office in the SW corner, and on the landing of the main (West off the courtyard) stairwell there is a modest naive style mural by local artist Manuel Lepe.
- Saucedo Theatre Building (Juárez and Iturbide) – Built in 1922 in a Belle Époque style reminiscent of architecture of the Porfirato. The theater presented live shows and films on its first floor, and the second floor housed a ballroom. The building has been converted to retail use.

=== Landmarks south of Puerto Vallarta ===
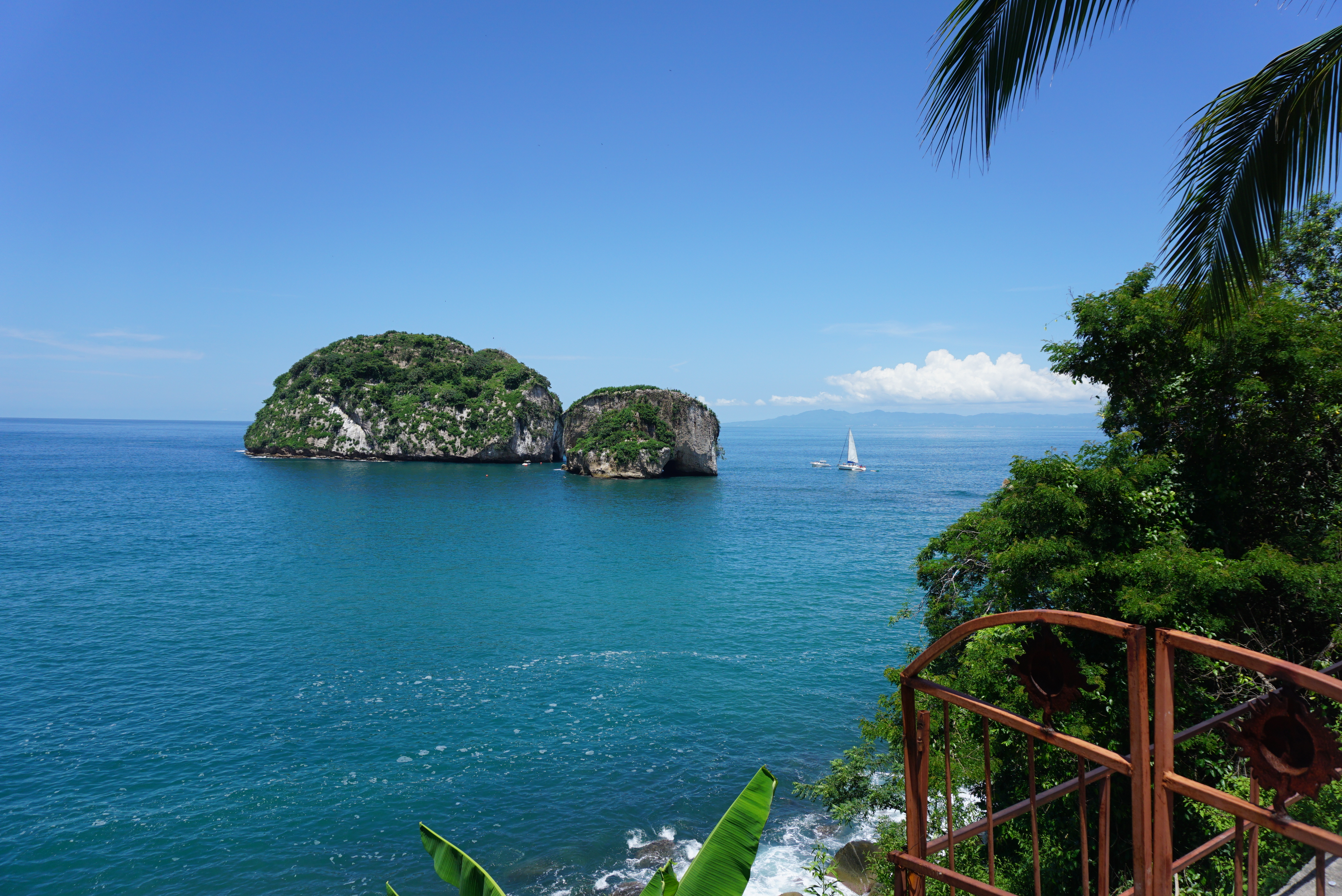
Los Arcos Marine Park

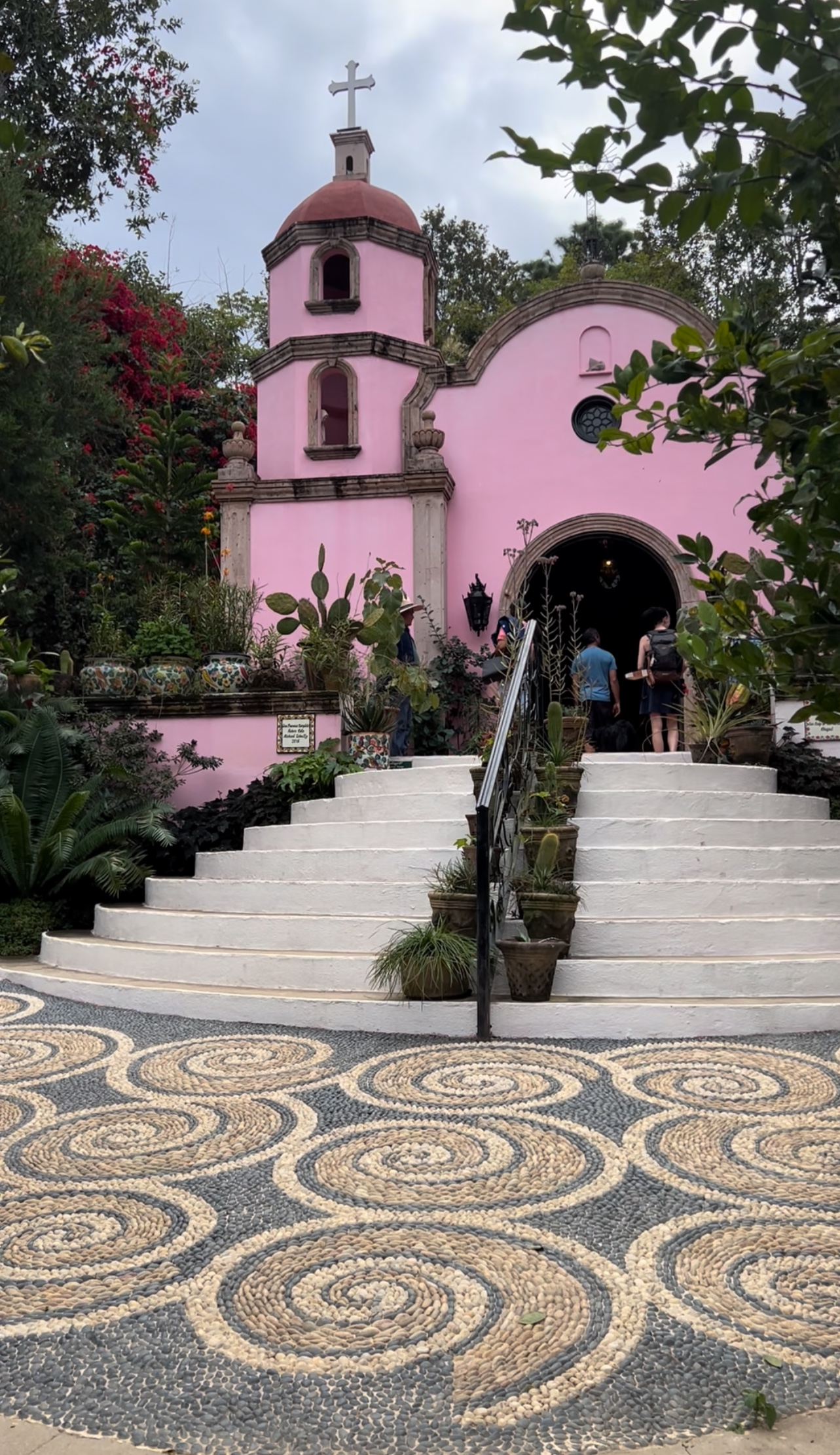
Vallarta Botanical Gardens

- Los Arcos National Marine Park – offshore of Mismaloya 12 km south of Puerto Vallarta. The area has been a National Marine Park since 1984. The area is protected as a breeding ground for pelicans, boobies and other sea birds. The park is a popular snorkeling destination both for the rocks themselves and for the fossilized coral beds that surround them.
- Vallarta Botanical Gardens – A popular showcase of orchids, agaves, cactus, palms, and other native plants. A restaurant and river swimming is also available to visitors. The gardens are located 14 mi (23 km) South of Puerto Vallarta on Highway 200. Buses for the Vallarta Botanical Gardens depart from the corner of Carranzas and Aguacate Streets in the Zona Romantica and are labeled as both "El Tuito" and "Botanical Gardens".
- Puerto Vallarta Zoo – with 350 animals, and located in a forested setting in Mismaloya.

=== Landmarks east of Puerto Vallarta ===
- Terra Noble Art and Healing Center – a New Age spa, meditation center and artist retreat on the hills east of Puerto Vallarta along the edge of the Agua Azul Nature Reserve overlooking Bahía de Banderas. The complex, built to resemble an early Mexican wattle and daub home was created by architect Jorge Rubio in conjunction with American sculptor Suzy Odom.

=== Beaches and beach towns ===
==== Beaches in Puerto Vallarta ====
- Playa Camarones (Shrimp Beach) – Colonia 5 de Diciembre (vicinity of Av. Paragua – Hotel Buenaventura. This is the northernmost public beach in the City of Puerto Vallarta proper. It is named after the shrimp fishermen that once landed their launches on the beach to unload their catch.
- Playa Olas Altas (High Waves Beach) – Colonia Emiliano Zapata – the beach extends from the Cuale River South to the fishing pier. In spite of the name, the waves offshore are not particularly high, and the beach is a popular place to swim, especially for locals and national tourists. The beach is lined with outdoor restaurants.
- Playa de los Muertos (Beach of the Dead) – Colonia Emiliano Zapata – the city's largest public beach. Legend has it the beach's name (Dead Men's Beach) stems from a battle between pirates and local miners after which bodies remained strewn on the beach, but it's a legend, since there were never any miners in Vallarta. The South Side of the beach is a popular gathering spot for gay and lesbian tourists. The North end is frequented mostly by locals, and national tourists. The city has recently tried to change the name of the beach to Playa del Sol.

=== Local festivals ===
- Beef Dip Bear Week – annual gay event for bears and their admirers at end of January and beginning of February.
- Flower and Garden Festival (last week of February) – week of tours, classes, and workshops at the Vallarta Botanical Gardens. Dozens of plant, garden, flower, and local craft vendors feature their products and knowledge.
- Electro Beach Puerto Vallarta (42-day festival starting in the beginning of March) – electronic dance music (EDM) festival
- May Festival (last week of May and first week of June) – commemorating the anniversary of the municipality. The festival features outdoor concerts, artistic expositions, sporting events and a parade.
- Día de Muertos – Day of the Dead (November 2) – A day of honoring the dead in full Mexican Tradition held at the Vallarta Botanical Gardens. Workshops on making catrina skeleton dolls and cempasúchil (Tagetes erecta) flower arrangements are followed by celebrations in the Garden of Memories and a bonfire dance.
- Las Posadas (20 December) – An evening of candlelight caroling & processions to handmade nativities is hosted by the Vallarta Botanical Gardens. Poinsettias and native Mexican pines are also featured during the celebrations.
- 1 to 12 December – Festival of the Virgin of Guadalupe.

== Neighborhoods ==
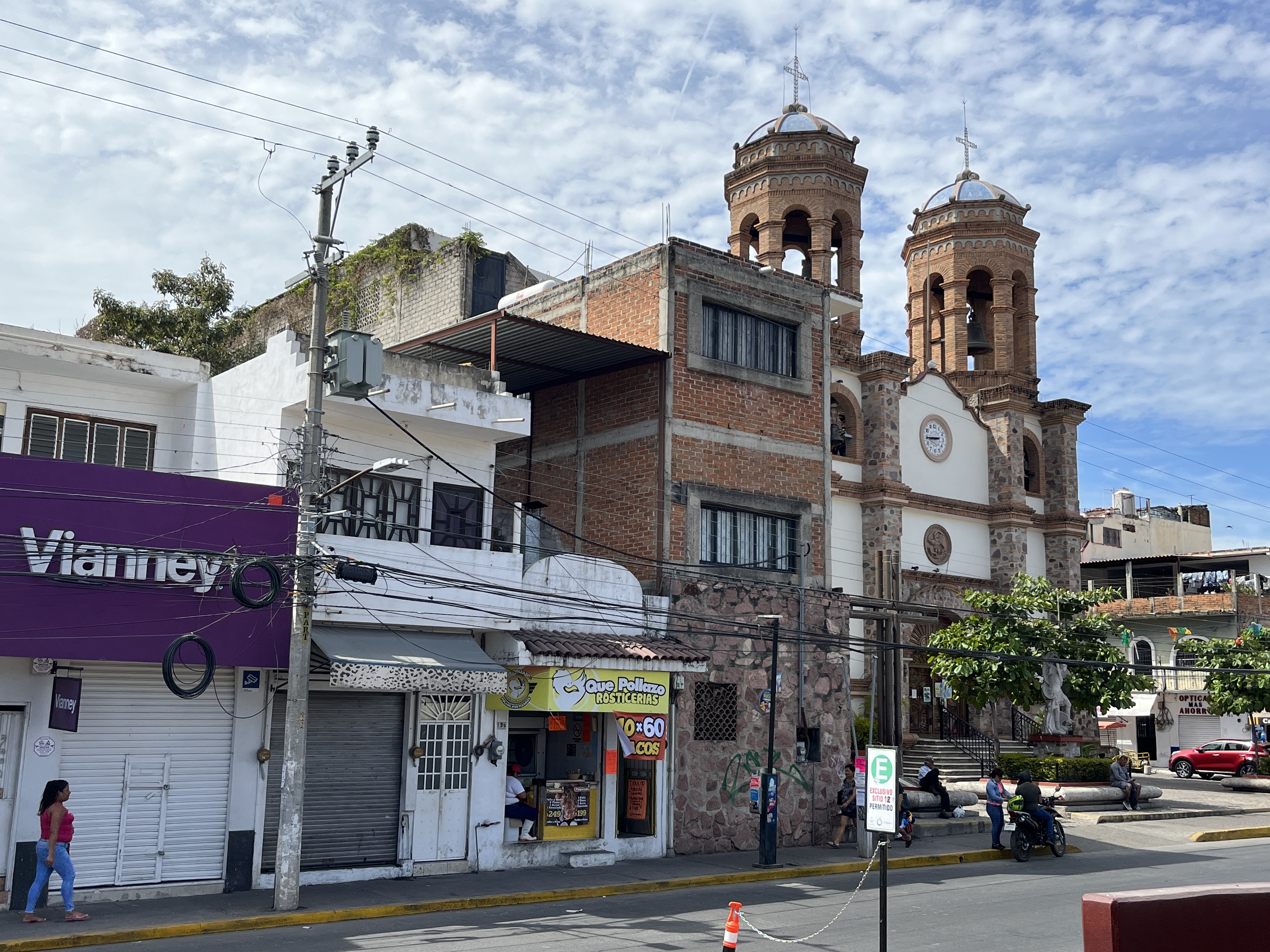
Colonia Centro Pitillal

Puerto Vallarta comprises numerous neighborhoods (colonias). Notable neighborhoods include (from South to North)

- Res. Conchas Chinas – hillside Southeast from Los Muertos beach.
- Col. Alta Vista.
- Amapas – on the hillside behind Los Muertos beach overlooking the bay.
- Col. Emiliano Zapata – South of the Cuale (called Zona Romántica or "Old Town" in tourist brochures).
- Cols. Caloso and Canoas – east of Col. Emiliano Zapata and up the Rio Cuale.
- Col. Centro – the oldest section of town and its current center – North of the Cuale river to Parque Hidalgo.
- Col. 5 de Diciembre – just north of the Centro, and with Col. Zapata among the first neighborhoods beyond the Centro to be developed.
- Col. Lázaro Cardenas – which houses a large recreation complex and the city's largest fish market – Parque Hidalgo to the Libramiento.
- Col. Versalles – the old Zona Rosa, prior to the development of the North Hotel Zone.
- Hotel Zone – Follows the coastline into down Vallarta from the airport. Lined with hotels, timeshare resorts and residential towers.
- Cols. Bugambillas and Ramblases – located on the NW slopes of the hills East of the city and relatively poor areas serviced mostly by dirt roads except for the hillside areas which have good views and thus attract residents with more resources.
- Marina Vallarta – a large planned real estate tourism development near the airport with a marina, golf course, hotels, timeshare resorts and residential areas of homes and condominiums.
- Del. Pitillal – once a small town and now a populous neighborhood, a separate delegación but now part of the City of Puerto Vallarta proper.
- Col. Bobadilla – just north of Pitillal and also an important residential area.

The city also includes numerous fraccionamientos, densely built residential blocks that provide affordable housing for the city's workforce.

Additionally the municipality of Puerto Vallarta comprises a few other significant population centers (from South to North):

- Boca de Tomatlán (pop. 570)
- Mismaloya (pop. 970)
- Las Juntas
- Ixtapa (pop. 25,700) (n.b. there is a more well known Ixtapa in Guerrero – a resort development near the village of Zihuatanejo)
- La Desembocada
- El Ranchito (El Colesio)
- El Colorado
- Las Palmas de Arriba

== Sister cities ==
- Highland Park, Illinois, United States
- Santa Barbara, California, United States
- McAllen, Texas, United States

== Notable people ==
- Francisco Javier Bravo (born 1967), politician affiliated with the Institutional Revolutionary Party (born in Puerto Vallarta)
- Aarón Díaz (born 1982), Mexican American actor, singer, and model (born in Puerto Vallarta, raised in Palo Alto, California, in U.S.)
- Ariadne Díaz (born 1985), actress and former model (born in Puerto Vallarta)
- Rodolfo Dickson (born 1997), Mexican Canadian alpine skier (originally from Puerto Vallarta, based in Vancouver, British Columbia, Canada)
- Al and Barbara Garvey (Albert Garvey, born 1932, Chicago, Illinois/Barbara Sue Harman, born 1934, Champaign, Illinois), American artist and tango dancing couple (originally from Illinois, U.S., currently based in Puerto Vallarta)
- Rafael González Reséndiz (born 1979), politician affiliated with the PRI (born in Puerto Vallarta)
- Anjulí Ladrón de Guevara (born 1986), professional football Goalkeeper (born in Puerto Vallarta)
- Manuel Lepe Macedo (1936–1984), artist and painter (originally from Puerto Vallarta, lived until his death in Guadalajara, Jalisco)
- Gerardo López Villaseñor (born 1995), tennis player (born in Puerto Vallarta)
- Natasha Moraga, American-born Mexican tile artist (originally from La Mirada, California in U.S., currently based in Puerto Vallarta)
- Marco Antonio Nazareth (1986–2009), professional boxer (born and lived until his death in Puerto Vallarta)
- Alberto Ramírez (born 1986), footballer (born in Puerto Vallarta)

== See also ==
- List of public art in Puerto Vallarta
- Marieta Islands
- Mexican Riviera
- Mirador de la Cruz
- Tourism in Mexico
