= Marina Vallarta =

Development in Puerto Vallarta, Jalisco, Mexico

- City and municipality
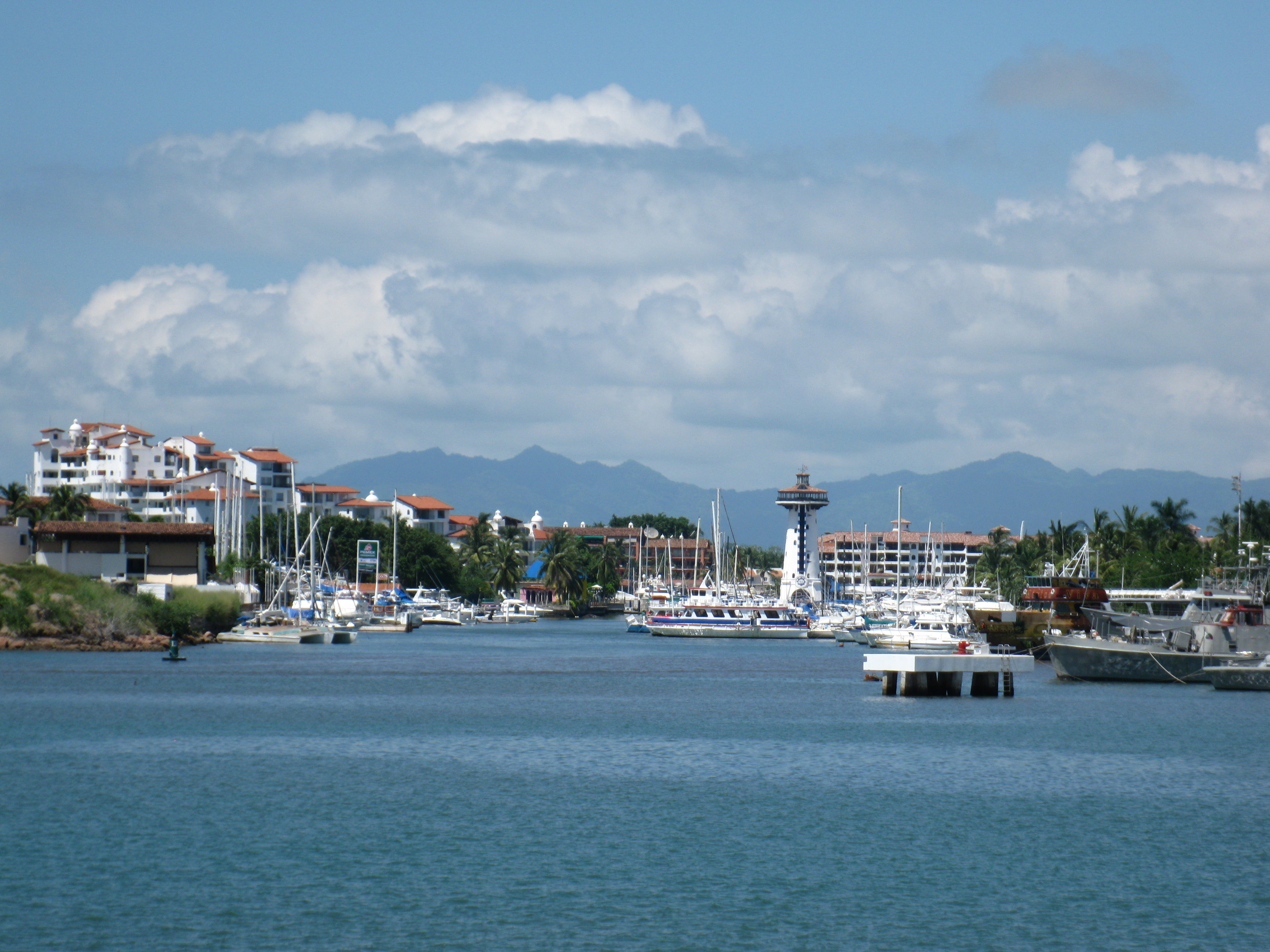
- View of the development

- Location within Jalisco Location within Mexico
- Coordinates: 20.6640°N 105.2531°W
- Country: Mexico
- State: Jalisco

Population
  - Total: 1,250
- Time zone: UTC-6 (CST)

Marina Vallarta is a marina and planned development in Puerto Vallarta, Jalisco, Mexico. Marina Vallarta has galleries and shops, hotels, and shopping centres, including Plaza Marina (which has the grocery store Comercial Mexicana) and Plaza Neptune at the marina's northwest end. The marina can house 350-450 boats. Restaurants in the area have included Nikki Beach, Tribu, and Victor's Place. A golf course is just north of Marina Vallarta.
