= Mirador de la Cruz =

Scenic viewpoint and tourist attraction in Puerto Vallarta, Jalisco, Mexico

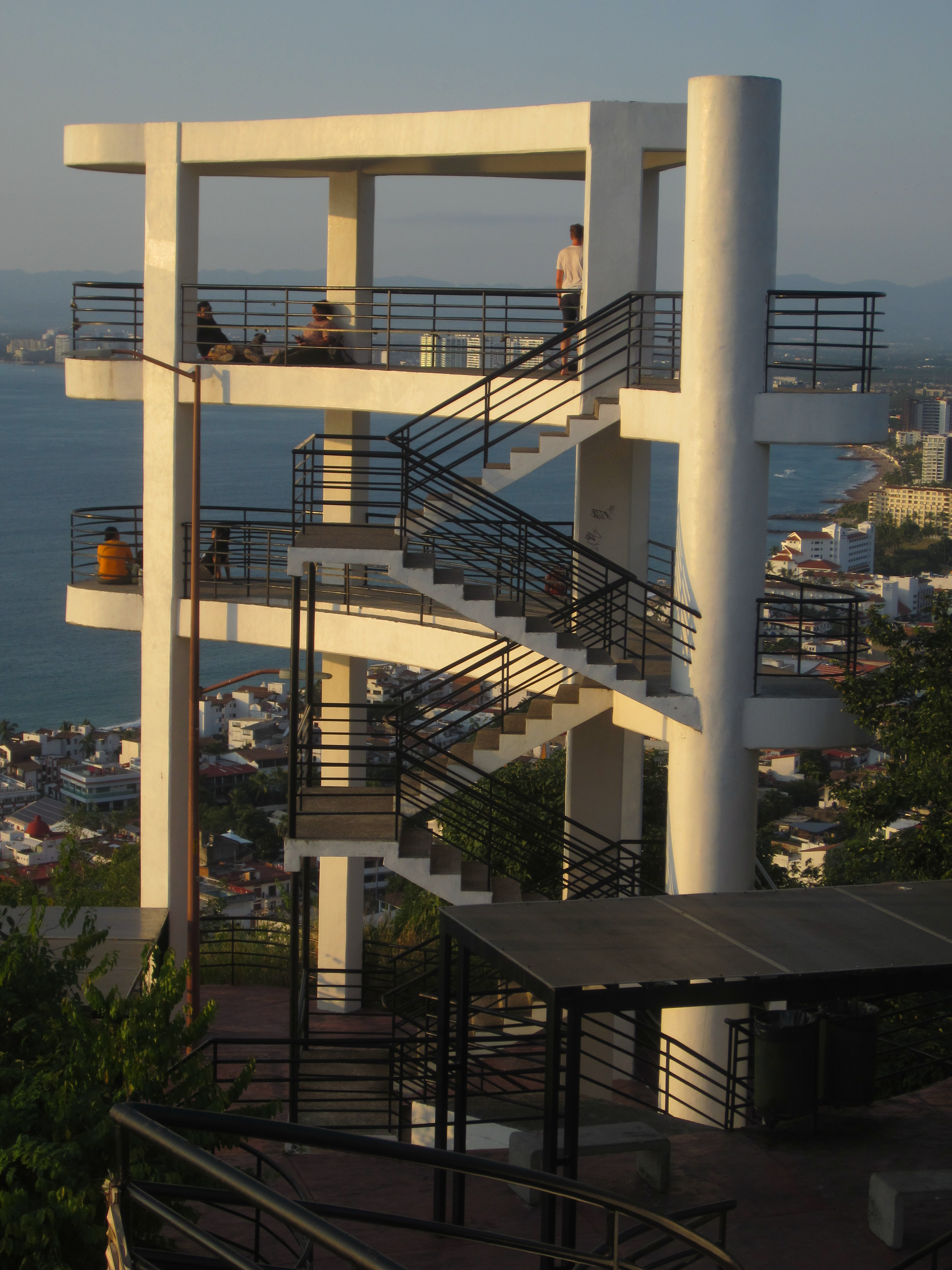
- Part of the structure, 2021
- Location: Puerto Vallarta, Jalisco, Mexico
- Location within Mexico
- Coordinates: 20°36′36″N 105°13′47.5″W

Mirador de la Cruz (English: Lookout on Cross Hill) is a popular scenic viewpoint and tourist attraction in Puerto Vallarta, in the Mexican state of Jalisco.

In Fodor's 2021 overview of "ultimate things to do" in the city, Nathan Aguilera said, "The hike is a bit grueling but doesn’t last long, and you’ll be rewarded with some of the best views in all of Puerto Vallarta. The stairs are steep and rustic at best, so this is another tour not suited for those with mobility issues, and again, you’ll need to be reasonably fit."
