= Versalles, Puerto Vallarta =

Versalles
- Colonia
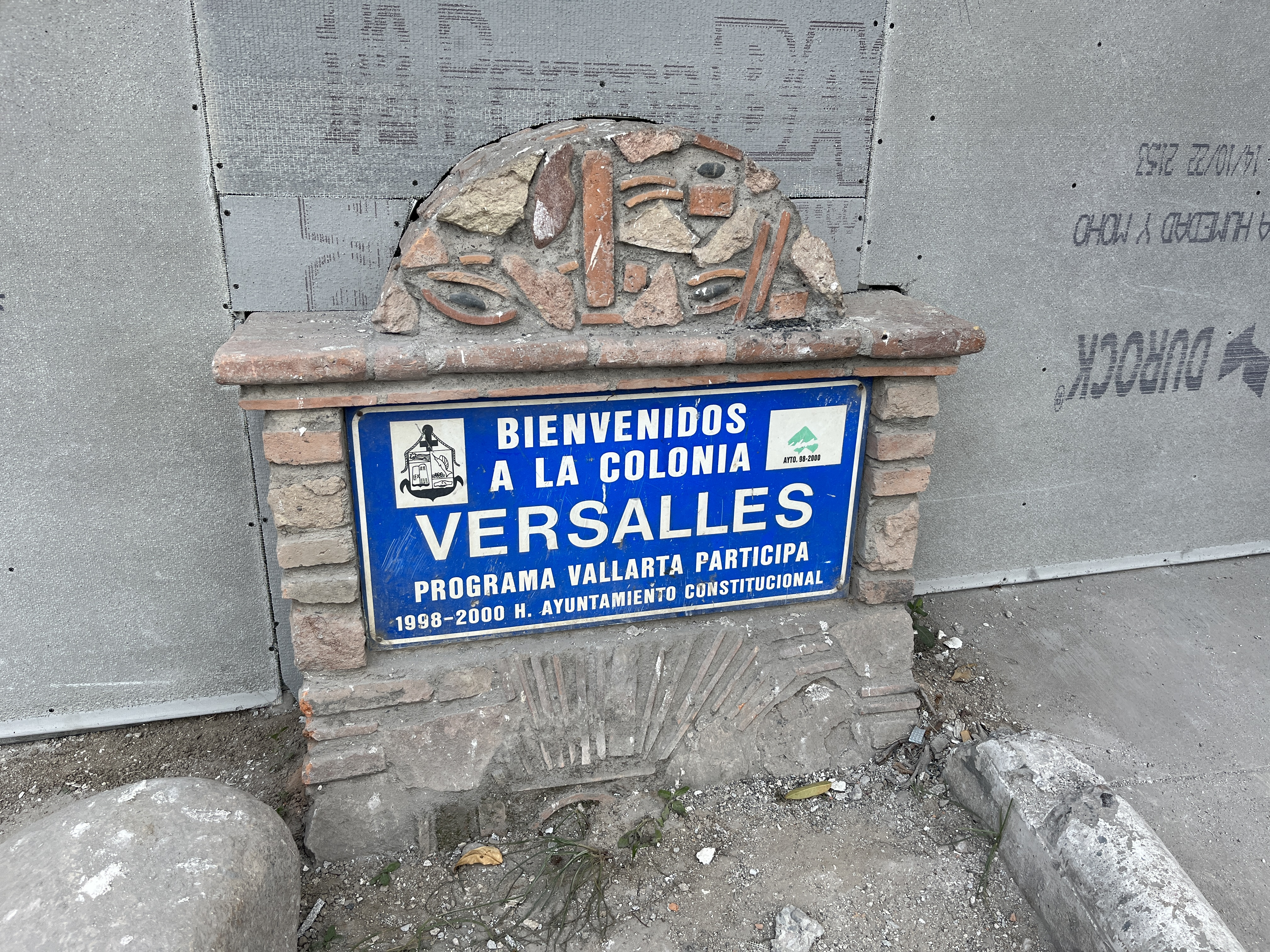
- Sign for the neighborhood, 2023
- Interactive map of Versalles
- Coordinates: 20°38′07″N 105°13′40″W
- Country: Mexico
- State: Jalisco
- Municipality/City: Puerto Vallarta

Population
  - Total: 1,860

Versalles is a colonia (or neighborhood) in Puerto Vallarta, in the Mexican state of Jalisco.
