= Playa Conchas Chinas =

Beach in Puerto Vallarta, Jalisco, Mexico

- Beach
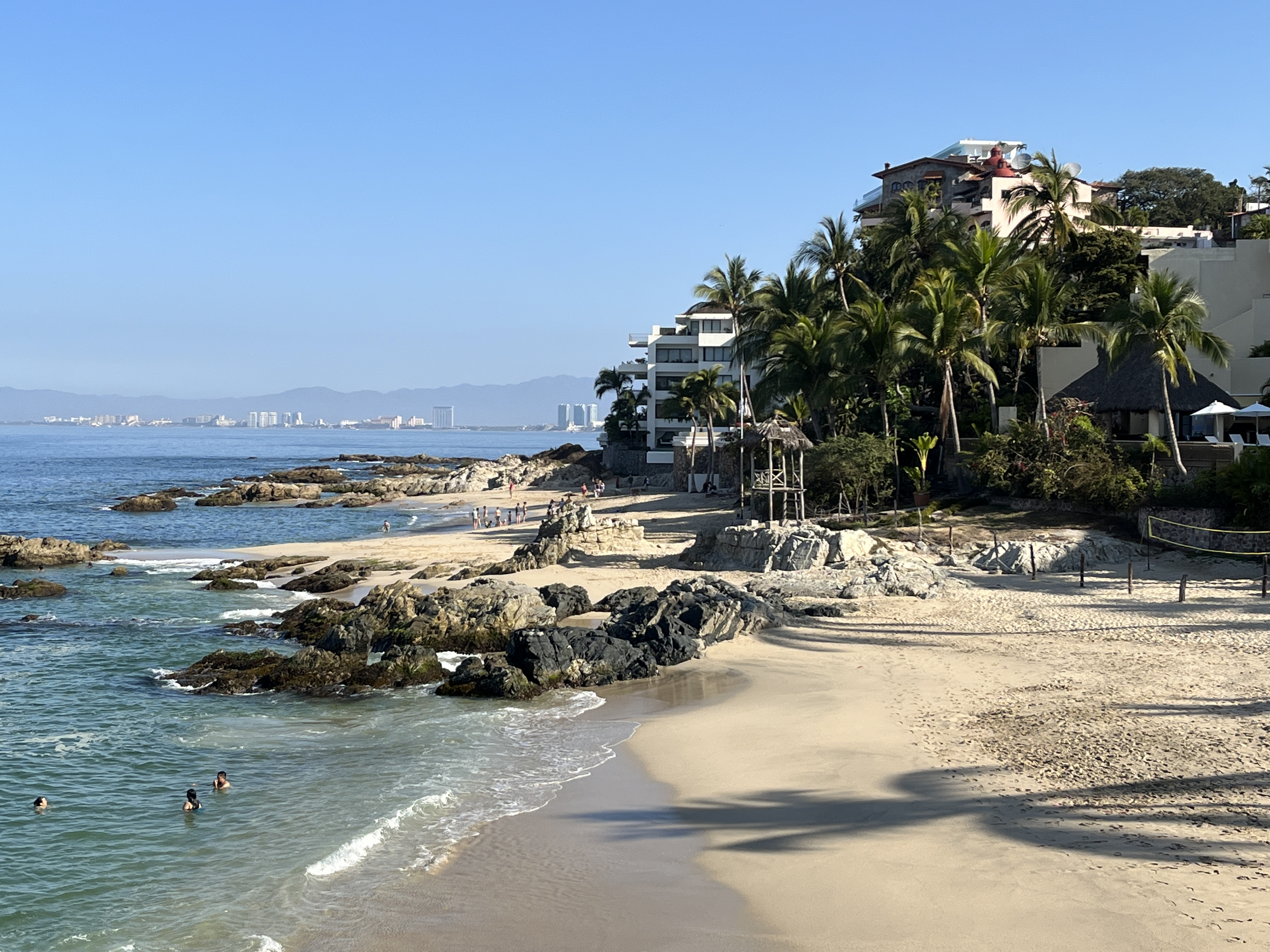

- Coordinates: 20°35′29″N 105°14′39″W
- Location: Puerto Vallarta, Jalisco, Mexico

Playa Conchas Chinas is a beach in Puerto Vallarta, in the Mexican state of Jalisco.

Lonely Planet describes Playa Conchas Chinas is "a tiny cove favored by families for the shallow and sheltered pools created by the burly rock reef further out" and says, "Although the cove is small, the beach is blond and reasonably wide, with lifeguards on duty."
